= List of amphibians and reptiles of Panay =

The island of Panay in the Philippines is home to various species of reptiles and amphibians.

The following list is from Ferner, et al. (2000). (?) denotes the identification of the species is uncertain, although the genus is clearly identified.

== Frogs ==
Frogs (Anura) that are endemic to the Visayas belong to the genera Kaloula, Limnonectes, and Platymantis.

- Bufo marinus (Cane toad)
- Fejervarya cancrivora cancrivora (Rana cancrivora)
- Fejervarya vittigera (Rana vittigera)
- Kaloula conjuncta negrosensis
- Kaloula picta
- Kaloula sp.
- Limnonectes leytensis (?)
- Limnonectes visayanus
- Occidozyga laevis (Common puddle frog)
- Platymantis corrugatus
- Platymantis dorsalis
- Platymantis negrosensis
- Platymantis insulatus
- Platymantis panayensis
- Platymantis paengi
- Platymantis sp. 1
- Platymantis sp. 2
- Platymantis sp. 3
- Rana erythraea (Common green frog)
- Rana everetti (Hylarana albotuberculata) (?)
- Polypedates leucomystax (Common tree frog)

== Turtles ==
- Cuora amboinensis amboinensis

== Lizards ==
- Bronchocela sp.
- Draco spilopterus
- Hydrosaurus pustulatus
- Gonocephalus sp.
- Cosymbotus platyurus
- Cyrtodactylus annulatus
- Cyrtodactylus philippinicus
- Gehyra mutilata
- Gekko gecko (Tokay gecko)
- Gekko gigante
- Gekko mindorensis
- Hemidactylus frenatus (Common house gecko)
- Hemidactylus stejnegeri
- Hemiphyllodactylus insularis
- Lepidodactylus lugubris
- Lepidodactylus planicauda
- Brachymeles boulengeri taylori
- Brachymeles talinis
- Brachymeles tridactylus
- Dasia grisea
- Dasia semicincta
- Emoia atrocostata
- Lamprolepis smaragdina philippinica
- Lipinia pulchella taylori
- Mabuya indeprensa
- Mabuya multicarinata borealis
- Mabuya multifasciata
- Otosaurus cumingii
- Parvoscincus sisoni
- Sphenomorphus arborens
- Sphenomorphus coxi divergens
- Sphenomorphus jagori grandis
- Sphenomorphus steerei
- Tropidophorus grayi
- Varanus salvator nuchalis

== Snakes ==
- Acrochordus granulatus
- Python reticulatus
- Ahaetulla prasina preocularis
- Boiga angulata
- Boiga cynodon (?)
- Boiga dendrophila (?)
- Calamaria gervaisi
- Cerberus rynchops
- Chrysopelea paradisi
- Cyclocorus lineatus alcalai
- Dendrelaphis caudolineatus terrificus
- Dendrelaphis pictus pictus
- Elaphe erythrura psephenoura
- Gonyosoma oxycephala
- Hologerrhum dermali
- Lycodon aulicus capucinus
- Oligodon modestum
- Psammodynastes pulverulentus
- Pseudorabdion mcnamarae
- Pseudorabdion oxycephalum
- Pseudorabdion talonuran
- Tropidonophis negrosensis
- Zaocys luzonensis
- Calliophis calligaster gemianulis
- Hydrophis belcheri
- Hydrophis cyanocinctus
- Hydrophis elegans
- Hydrophis inornatus
- Lapemis hardwickii
- Laticauda colubrina
- Ramphotyphlops braminus
- Rhamphotyphlops cumingii
- Typhlops castanotus
- Typhlops hypogius (= Typhlops ruber ?) ?
- Tropidolaemus wagleri (?)
- Trimereserus flavomaculatus

== Sources ==
- Ferner, John W., et al. 2000. The Amphibians and Reptiles of Panay Island. Philippines Asiatic Herpetological Research Vol. 9, pp. 1–37.
