= Platymantis quezoni =

Conservation status
- Data Deficient (IUCN 3.1)

Scientific classification
- Kingdom: Animalia
- Phylum: Chordata
- Class: Amphibia
- Order: Anura
- Family: Ceratobatrachidae
- Genus: Platymantis
- Species: P. quezoni

Binomial name
- Platymantis quezoni Brown, De Layola, Lorenzo, Diesmos & Diesmos, 2015

Species of frog

Platymantis quezoni is a species of frog in the family Ceratobatrachidae. It is endemic to the Philippines. Its type locality is in the Quezon Protected Landscape, where it is found in limestone karst habitats. It may also be found in limestone karst habitats in Bondoc Peninsula.

The adult male frog measures 22.1–33.9 mm in snout-vent length and the adult female frog 32.4–39.7 mm. It is tan to brown in color with darker marks. It lives in karst-rich habitats.

Other Platymantis species dwelling in limestone karst habitats are Platymantis bayani, Platymantis biak, Platymantis insulatus, Platymantis paengi, and Platymantis spelaea.
