= Mounts Banahaw–San Cristobal Protected Landscape =

Protected area in Calabarzon, Philippines

- IUCN category III (natural monument or feature)
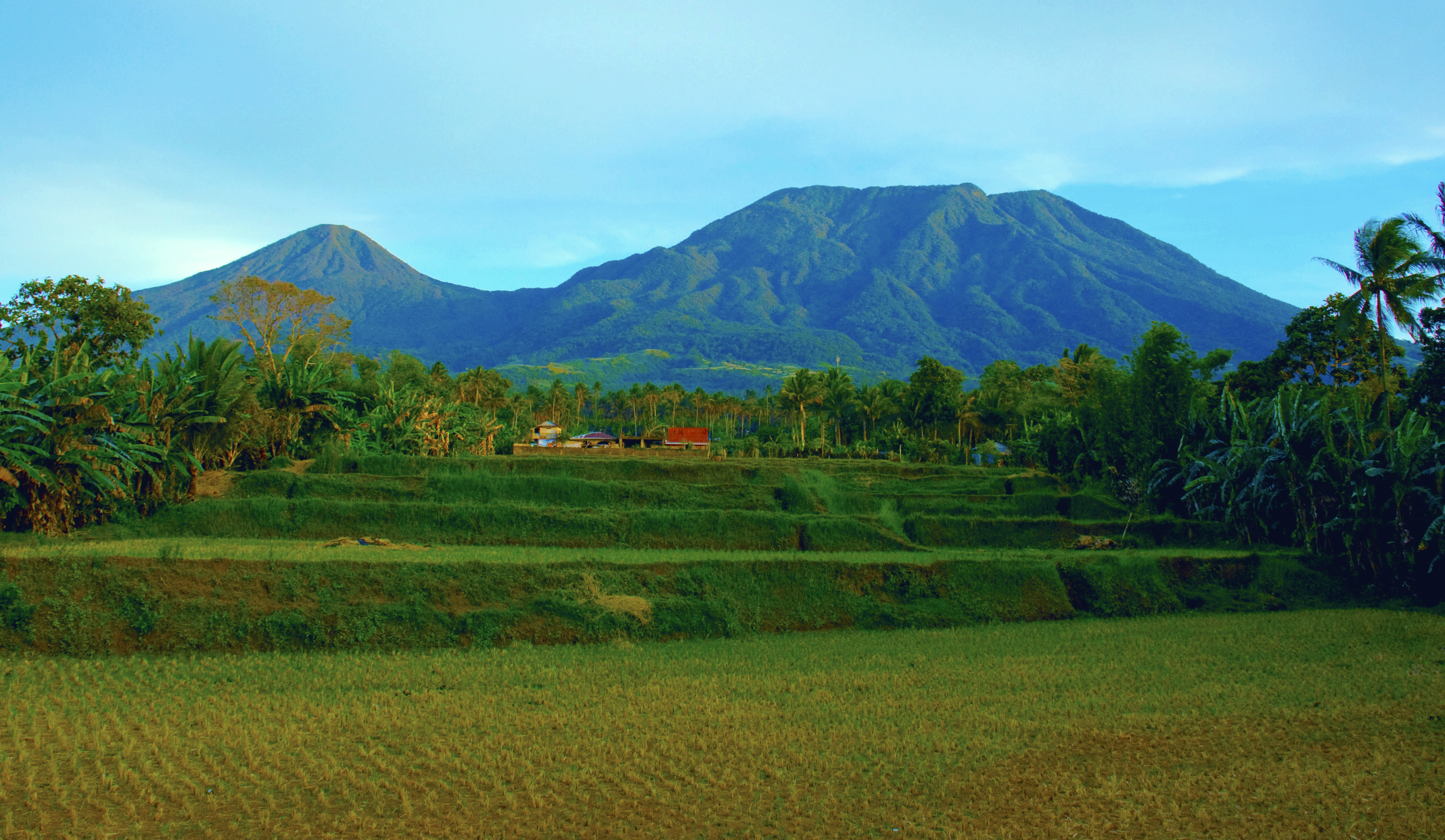
- Mount Banahaw (right) and Mount Banahao de lucban (left)

- Location within Philippines
- Location: Laguna and Quezon, Philippines
- Nearest city: San Pablo, Laguna
- Coordinates: 14°3′13″N 121°29′9″E
- Area: 10,900.59 hectares (26,935.9 acres)
- Established: October 14, 1921 (Forest reserve); May 21, 1941 (National park); June 25, 2003 (Protected landscape)
- Governing body: Department of Environment and Natural Resources

Mounts Banahaw–San Cristobal Protected Landscape is a protected landscape park in the Calabarzon region of the Philippines, 120 kilometres (75 mi) south of Manila. It is the second largest protected area in Calabarzon, after the Upper Marikina River Basin Protected Landscape, with an area of 10,900.59 hectares (26,935.9 acres). The park is located at the border of Laguna and Quezon provinces and includes the features it is named after: Mount Banahaw and, 7 kilometres (4.3 mi) to its west, Mount San Cristobal.

The two dormant volcanoes contain some of the most extensive closed canopy forests in Laguna and Quezon. The mountain park serves as an important watershed for the surrounding plains. Its accessibility to Manila and other major urban areas in Calabarzon makes it a popular destination for tourists and mountaineers. It is also visited by pilgrims being considered a holy site by certain religious denominations in southern Luzon.

== Geography ==
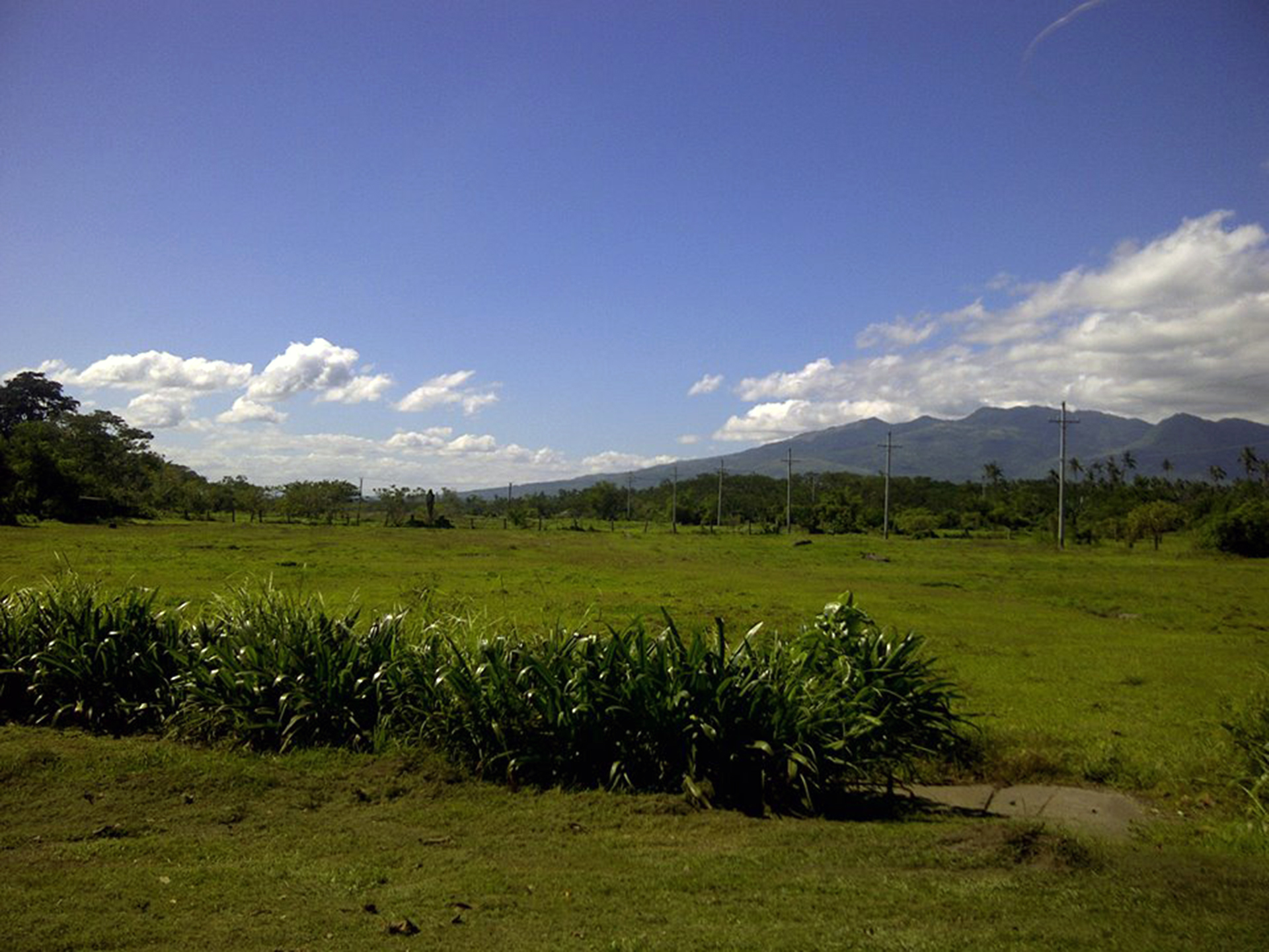
Mounts Banahaw–San Cristobal Protected Landscape

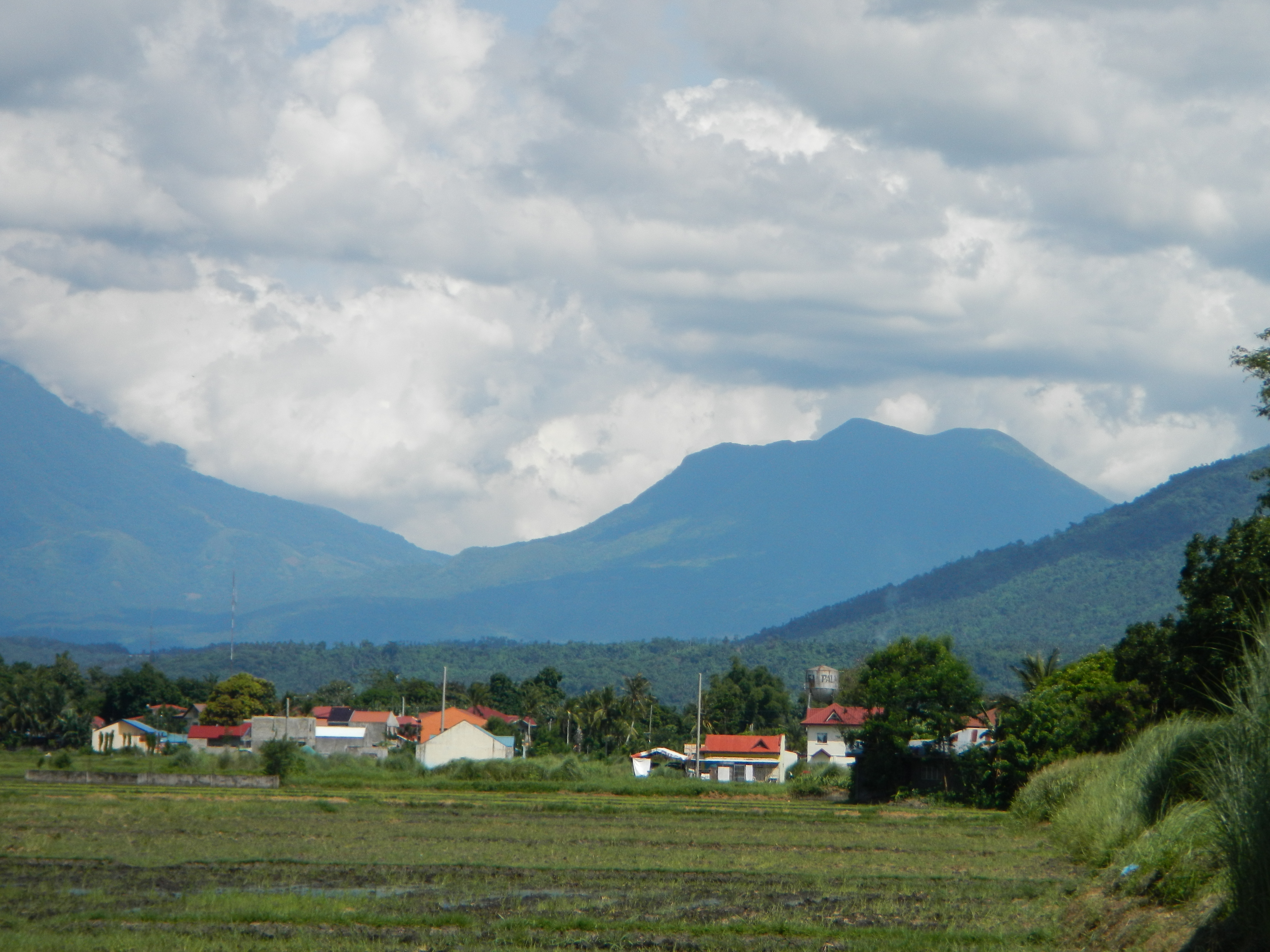
Mount San Cristobal as viewed from Victoria, Laguna

The park spans across the southern Laguna municipalities of Majayjay, Nagcarlan, Liliw, Rizal and San Pablo and the northern Quezon municipalities of Dolores, Candelaria, Sariaya, Lucban and Tayabas. It covers the entire 10,784.05-hectare (26,648.0-acre) Mount Banahaw with its three peaks: Mount Banahaw de Dolores, Mount Banahaw de Lucban and Mount Banahaw de Tayabas, and the entire 116.54-hectare (288.0-acre) Mount San Cristobal. The area includes the headwaters of eight rivers namely, the Kinabuhayan, Talong Ambon, Balayong, Maimpis, Dalitiwan, Malinao, Nagcarlan and San Diego Rivers which provide water for domestic consumption and irrigation of surrounding communities. It is also the location of several waterfalls which are popular among pilgrims and devotees such as the Santa Lucia, Suplina and Cristalino Falls on Mount San Cristobal in Dolores.

The protected area is characterized by dipterocarp forest, covering the lower slopes, montane forest above 900 metres (3,000 ft), and mossy forest around the peak. There are also areas of coconut plantations and fruit trees in the lower slopes including areas of kaingin.

It also contains some historical and religious attractions such as: a shrine dedicated to Hermano Pule and caves that have been converted into religious shrines.

== History ==
The park was originally established in 1921 as the Mount Banahao Forest Reserve covering an area of 12,858 hectares (31,770 acres). It was established through Proclamation No. 42 signed by Governor-General Leonard Wood for the reforestation, conservation and water protection of the area comprising mounts Banahao and San Cristobal. In 1941, President Manuel Luis Quezon signed Proclamation No. 716 reducing its size to 11,133.30 hectares (27,511.0 acres) divided into two parcels and declaring it a national park. Amendments to its area were made in 1961 and again, in 1966. In 2003, the Mounts Banahaw–San Cristobal National Park was reclassified as a protected landscape under the National Integrated Protected Areas System with the issuance of Proclamation No. 411 by President Gloria Arroyo.

== Biodiversity ==
Banahaw–San Cristobal is home to several endemic fauna which includes the Philippine pygmy fruit bat, Luzon fruit bat, Small Luzon forest mouse and Philippine warty pig. It is also inhabited by amphibians such as the Banahao forest frog, Naomi's forest frog, Japanese bullet frog, common forest tree frog, the Sphenomorphus steerei and Platymantis montanus.

The park is also home to a threatened and restricted-range bird population recorded in 2001 such as the Philippine eagle, Philippine eagle-owl, Flame-breasted fruit dove and Philippine cockatoo. It also hosts a number of unique flora including palms, ferns and mahogany trees such as the Aglaia banahaensis.
