= Platymantis isarog =

Conservation status
- Least Concern (IUCN 3.1)

Scientific classification
- Kingdom: Animalia
- Phylum: Chordata
- Class: Amphibia
- Order: Anura
- Family: Ceratobatrachidae
- Genus: Platymantis
- Species: P. isarog

Binomial name
- Platymantis isarog Brown, Brown, Alcala, and Frost, 1997

Synonyms
- Platymantis reticulatus Brown, Brown, and Alcala, 1997 – homonym of Platymantis reticulatus Zhao and Li, 1984; Platymantis isarog Brown, Brown, Alcala, and Frost, 1997 – replacement name

Species of amphibian

Platymantis isarog, sometimes known as the Isarog forest frog, is a species of frog in the family Ceratobatrachidae. It is endemic to southeastern Luzon, Philippines, where it is known from two volcanos, Mount Isarog (its type locality) and Mount Malinao.

== Description ==
Adult males measure 23–28 mm (0.9–1.1 in) and adult females 28–30 mm (1.1–1.2 in) in snout–vent length. The snout is broadly rounded. The tympanum is distinct. The fingers have no webbing whereas the toes are webbed. The hind limbs are moderately long. The dorsum has grayish to orange brown background color and is marked with varied darker spots and blotches. Some specimens have a pale vertebral line starting from the beginning on the snout. The hind limbs have dark transverse bars. There are yellowish, brown-ringed areolations in the groin, on the thighs, and frequently the lower legs. The venter has brown spots or reticulations (this species was originally named as P. reticulatus in reference to the latter).

== Habitat and conservation ==
Platymantis isarog is an arboreal frog that occurs in mossy and montane rainforests at elevations of 650–1,800 m (2,130–5,910 ft) above sea level. It deposits its eggs on leaves in shrub layer vegetation. The egg have direct development (i.e, there is no free-living larval stage).

This species is common in mid- to upper-montane forests on Mount Isarog, and the population there appears to be stable; it is well-protected by the Mount Isarog National Park. There is geothermal power generation on the slopes of Mount Malinao, but its impact is limited. Thus, despite its limited distribution, this species is not considered threatened by the IUCN SSC Amphibian Specialist Group.
