= Visayas State University =

Public university in Leyte, Philippines

- Pambansang Pamantasan ng Visayas (Filipino)
- Former names: List: Baybay Agricultural School (1924–1934); Baybay Agricultural High School (1934–1938); Baybay National Agricultural School (1938–1960); Visayas Agricultural College (1960–1975); Visayas State College of Agriculture (1975-2001); Leyte State University (2001-2007)
- Motto: Relevance, Integrity, Truth, and Excellence
- Type: Public regional state higher education institution
- Established: April 27, 1924; 102 years ago
- President: Dr. Prose Ivy Yepes
- Vice-president: List: Dr. Rotacio S. Gravoso (VP for Academic Affairs); Dr. Aleli A. Villocino (VP for Student Affairs & Services); Dr. Moises Neil V. Seriño (VP for Administration & Finance); Dr. Santiago T. Peña, Jr. (VP for Research, Extension, & Innovation); Dr. Glenn G. Pajares (VP for Planning & Development)
- Location: Baybay, Leyte, Philippines; 10°44′38″N 124°47′31″E
- Campus: List; Main: Baybay, Leyte 1,099.4 hectares (10,994,000 m^{2}); Satellite: Alangalang, Leyte; Isabel, Leyte; Tolosa, Leyte; Villaba, Leyte
- Alma Mater song: VSU Hymn
- Colors: Green and Gold
- Nicknames: Viscans, Pythons
- Website: www.vsu.edu.ph
- Location in the Visayas Location in the Philippines

Visayas State University (VSU; Filipino: Pambansang Pamantasan ng Visayas) is a university located in the City of Baybay, Leyte, Philippines. The five-campus VSU system has twelve faculties, three institutes, and one school. Located on the five-campus system are Faculty of Agriculture and Food Science (FAFS), Faculty of Nursing (FON), Faculty of Veterinary Medicine (FVM), Faculty of Forestry and Environmental Science (FFES), Faculty of Management and Economics (FME), Faculty of Teacher Education (FTE), Faculty of Engineering (FE), Faculty of Computing (FOC), Faculty of Natural and Mathematical Sciences (FNMS), Faculty of Humanities and Social Sciences (FHSS), Faculty of Fisheries and Aquatic Sciences (FFAS), Faculty of Criminal Justice Education (FCJE), Institute of Strategic Research and Development Studies (ISRDS), Institute of Tropical Ecology and Environmental Management (ITEEM), Institute of Human Kinetics (IHK), and the Graduate School and Special Programs.

Visayas State University is acknowledged by the Philippine Department of Tourism as a tourist destination for its diverse flora and fauna, and with Mount Pangasugan and the Camotes Sea visible from the university. VSU administration promotes the school as a "Resort University" for having resorts and providing services like bungalows to visitors.

== History ==
The institution was founded as Baybay Agricultural School on June 2, 1924. In 1934, it was renamed as Baybay Agricultural High School, and in 1938 was named Baybay National Agricultural School (BNAS) through Commonwealth Act No. 313.

BNAS was renamed Visayas Agricultural College on June 19, 1960. Even though the institution offered higher education, it continued to offer secondary education as Experimental Rural High School.

It was renamed again to Visayas State College of Agriculture (ViSCA) on May 24, 1974. The university also offered elementary education through ViSCA Foundation Elementary School (VFES).

In 1999, the school was one of four schools combined into a five-campus system. ViSCA became Leyte State University on August 11, 2001.

The promulgation of Republic Act No. 9437 dated April 27, 2007, converted the then LSU into Visayas State University (VSU). The university also offered elementary and secondary education through ViSCA Foundation Elementary School (VFES) and VSU Laboratory High School (VSU-LHS) respectively. In 2018, The board of directors voted to rename VSU-LHS into VSU Integrated High School (VSU-IHS).

== Campuses ==
- Tolosa campus
  - College of Fisheries
- Isabel campus
  - College of Industrial Technology
- Alangalang campus
  - College of Environmental and Agricultural Technology
- Villaba campus
  - College of Education and Agricultural Technology

== Programs ==
The university specializes in agricultural research and education, including work in jatropha propagation for the production of biofuel and development of a dwarf macapuno coconut and root-crops, particularly, sweet potato, cassava and yam. The university hosts a program on rain forestation.

Programs are available in Agro-Industry, Engineering, Information Technology, Hospitality Management, Tropical Ecology, Veterinary Medicine, Forestry, Fishery, and Food Science and Technology.

The 1,099-hectare campus hosts 193 buildings composed of academic departments, research and trainings centers, staff and student housing facilities and other structures.

The main campus offers open university system for its distance education program. Its external campuses which are located in the different parts of Leyte are the College of Fisheries (VSU-Tolosa Campus), College of Industrial Technology (VSU-Isabel Campus), College of Environmental and Agricultural Technology (VSU-Alangalang Campus), College of Education and Agricultural Technology (VSU-Villaba Campus).

== Mount Pangasugan research ==
VSU is located by one of the last remaining rainforests in the Philippines. A study by Visayas State University (VSU) in Baybay, Leyte found many animal species listed by the World Conservation Union in the Red List of Threatened Animals (IUCN Red List), including the Philippine tarsier, Philippine flying fox, Fischer's pygmy fruit bat. New records of the microbat (Hipposideros obscurus), with a length of 5.5 centimeters and body weight of 10 grams, a type of skink (Tropidophorus grayi), and two new species of the Gobiidae fishes (Stiphodon olivaceus and Stiphodon surrufus) were also found by the VSU survey.

VSU’s Natural History Museum collected 43,000 arthropod specimens from 377 families and 500 genera on Mt. Pangasugan. A new species of orchid (Dendrobium milaniae) and a tiger beetle (Thopeutica milaniae) were named in honor of past VSU president Dr. Paciencia Po-Milan, a renowned ecologist.

Other endemic species include the eagle-owl, Philippine hawk-eagle, rufous-lored kingfisher, Philippine leafbird and miniature tit-babbler and flying lemur.

The Federal Republic of Germany (through the ViSCA-GTZ Applied Tropical Ecology Program, ViSCA, Baybay, Leyte, Philippines International) funded the VSU study to collect, identify, describe and document the existing species of aroids (Araceae) and orchids in Mt. Pangasugan. 25 species of aroids representing 12 genera were documented at elevations of up to 350 m ASL. Classified as erect ground dwellers or climbers, the most dominant aroid belong to Pothos and Epipremnum. The orchid species represent 16 genera, with the most dominant belonging to Phalaenopsis.

The Herpetofauna (herps) of Anibong, Jordan, Mt. Pangasugan Range, Leyte is a habitat to endemic species, which is so diverse and slightly distributed. The Mindanao State University-Iligan Institute of Technology identified 17 herpetofaunal species belonging to 6 families (Ranidae, Rhacophoridae, Agamidae, Scincidae, Colubridae, Viperidae), of which eight (47%) are endemics (Endemism). These endemic species include Limnonectes magnus, Platymantis corrugatus, Platymantis dorsalis, Brachymeles samarensis, Draco lineatus, Sphenomorphus jagori, Rhabdophis lineata and Trimeresurus flavomaculatus. Limnonectes magnus is already in the near-threatened category.

== See also ==
- List of forestry universities and colleges
- DYDC
- Media related to Visayas State University at Wikimedia Commons
