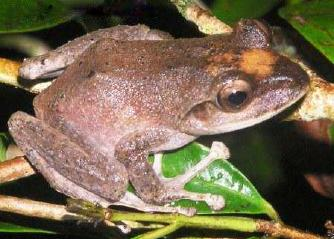
- Fiji tree frog (Platymantis vitiensis)

Scientific classification
- Kingdom: Animalia
- Phylum: Chordata
- Class: Amphibia
- Order: Anura
- Family: Ceratobatrachidae
- Subfamily: Ceratobatrachinae
- Genus: Platymantis; Günther, 1858

Type species
- Halophila vitiensis Girard, 1853

= Platymantis =

Genus of amphibians

Platymantis is a genus of frogs that belongs to the family Ceratobatrachidae. They are commonly known as wrinkled ground frogs, ground frogs, and forest frogs.

As currently defined, Platymantis is a large genus with up to as many as 60 species found mostly in the Philippines. However, it is known to be paraphyletic. Solving this problem will likely lead to a more narrowly defined Platymantis, possibly by transferring some species to a larger Ceratobatrachus (with Batrachylodes).

== Species ==
There are currently at least 30 extant species in this genus. Brown, et al. (2015) estimates that there may be a total of 50–60 species in Platymantis if all cryptic species were to be described.

- Platymantis banahao Brown, Alcala, Diesmos & Alcala, 1997
- Platymantis bayani Siler, Alcala, Diesmos, and Brown, 2009
- Platymantis biak Siler, Diesmos, Linkem, Diesmos, and Brown, 2010
- Platymantis cagayanensis Brown, Alcala & Diesmos, 1999
- Platymantis cornutus (Taylor, 1922)
- Platymantis corrugatus (Duméril, 1853)
- Platymantis diesmosi Brown & Gonzalez, 2007
- Platymantis dorsalis (Duméril, 1853)
- Platymantis guentheri (Boulenger, 1882)
- Platymantis guiting Camila G. Meneses, Kier Mitchel E. Pitogo, Syrus Cesar P. Decena, Christian E. Supsup & Rafe M. Brown
- Platymantis hazelae (Taylor, 1920)
- Platymantis indeprensus Brown, Alcala & Diesmos, 1999
- Platymantis insulatus Brown & Alcala, 1970
- Platymantis isarog Brown, Brown, Alcala & Frost, 1997
- Platymantis lawtoni Brown & Alcala, 1974
- Platymantis levigatus Brown & Alcala, 1974
- Platymantis luzonensis Brown, Alcala, Diesmos & Alcala, 1997
- Platymantis mimulus Brown, Alcala & Diesmos, 1997
- Platymantis montanus (Taylor, 1922)
- Platymantis naomii Alcala, Brown & Diesmos, 1998
- Platymantis negrosensis Brown, Alcala, Diesmos & Alcala, 1997
- Platymantis paengi Siler et al., 2007
- Platymantis panayensis Brown, Brown & Alcala, 1997
- Platymantis polillensis (Taylor, 1922)
- Platymantis pseudodorsalis Brown, Alcala & Diesmos, 1999
- Platymantis pygmaeus Alcala, Brown & Diesmos, 1998
- Platymantis quezoni Brown, Layola, Lorenzo, Diesmos & Diesmos, 2015
- Platymantis rabori Brown, Alcala, Diesmos & Alcala, 1997
- Platymantis sierramadrensis Brown, Alcala, Ong & Diesmos, 1999
- Platymantis spelaeus Brown & Alcala, 1982
- Platymantis subterrestris (Taylor, 1922)
- Platymantis taylori Brown, Alcala & Diesmos, 1999

In addition, there is an extinct species:

- Platymantis megabotoniviti, Giant Fiji ground frog

=== Species moved to genus Cornufer ===
Brown, et al. (2015) moved the Platymantis species of Oceania into the newly proposed genus Cornufer. Species in the Philippines remained in Platymantis.

- Cornufer aculeodactylus Brown, 1952
- Cornufer admiraltiensis Richards, Mack & Austin, 2007
- Cornufer akarithymus Brown & Tyler, 1968
- Cornufer batantae Zweifel, 1969
- Cornufer bimaculatus Günther, 1999
- Cornufer boulengeri (Boettger, 1892)
- Cornufer browni Allison & Kraus, 2001
- Cornufer bufonulus Kraus and Allison, 2007
- Cornufer caesiops Kraus and Allison, 2009
- Cornufer cheesmanae Parker, 1940
- Cornufer citrinospilus Brown, Richards, and Broadhead, 2013
- Cornufer cryptotis Günther, 1999
- Cornufer desticans Brown & Richards, 2008
- Cornufer gilliardi Zweifel, 1960
- Cornufer guppyi (Boulenger, 1884)
- Cornufer latro Richards, Mack & Austin, 2007
- Cornufer macrops (Brown, 1965)
- Cornufer macrosceles Zweifel, 1975
- Cornufer magnus Brown & Menzies, 1979 (synonym: Platymantis magna)
- Cornufer mamusiorum Foufopoulos and Brown, 2004
- Cornufer manus Kraus and Allison, 2009
- Cornufer mimica Brown & Tyler, 1968
- Cornufer nakanaiorum Brown, Foufopoulos, and Richards, 2006
- Cornufer neckeri (Brown & Myers, 1949)
- Cornufer nexipus Zweifel, 1975
- Cornufer papuensis Meyer, 1875
- Cornufer parilis Brown & Richards, 2008
- Cornufer parkeri (Brown, 1965)
- Cornufer pelewensis Peters, 1867
- Cornufer punctatus Peters & Doria, 1878
- Cornufer schmidti Brown & Tyler, 1968
- Cornufer solomonis (Boulenger, 1884)
- Cornufer sulcatus Kraus and Allison, 2007
- Cornufer vitianus (Duméril, 1853)
- Cornufer vitiensis (Girard, 1853)
- Cornufer weberi Schmidt, 1932
- Cornufer wuenscheorum Günther, 2006

== Endemic ranges ==
Many Platymantis species are endemic to highly restricted geographical areas within the Philippines.

- Widespread
  - Platymantis corrugatus
  - Platymantis dorsalis
- Luzon
  - Northern Luzon
    - Platymantis cagayanensis: Palaui Island; NE Luzon
    - Platymantis sierramadrensis: Sierra Madre
    - Platymantis taylori: Sierra Madre
    - Platymantis cornutus: Cordillera Central (Luzon)
    - Platymantis subterrestris: Cordillera Central (Luzon)
    - Platymantis pygmaeus: northern Luzon
  - Central Luzon
    - Platymantis biak: Biak-na-Bato National Park
    - Platymantis polillensis: Polillo Island; Aurora Province
    - Platymantis mimula: Mount Makiling
    - Platymantis banahao: Mount Banahaw
    - Platymantis indeprensus: Mount Banahaw
    - Platymantis montanus: Mount Banahaw
    - Platymantis naomii: Mount Banahaw
    - Platymantis pseudodorsalis: Mount Banahaw
    - Platymantis quezoni: Quezon Protected Landscape
  - Bicol Region
    - Platymantis isarog: Mount Isarog
    - Platymantis diesmosi: Malinao Volcano
    - Platymantis luzonensis: SE Luzon
- Visayas
  - Platymantis lawtoni: Romblon
  - Platymantis levigata: Romblon
  - Platymantis insulatus: South Gigante Island near Panay
  - Platymantis paengi: Pandan, Antique, Panay
  - Platymantis panayensis: Panay
  - Platymantis negrosensis: Panay; Negros
  - Platymantis hazelae: Negros
  - Platymantis spelaea: southern Negros
  - Platymantis bayani: Taft, Eastern Samar
  - Platymantis rabori: Bohol; Leyte; Mindanao
  - Platymantis guentheri: Bohol; Leyte; Mindanao
