= Mount Pangasugan =

Mountain in Leyte, Philippines

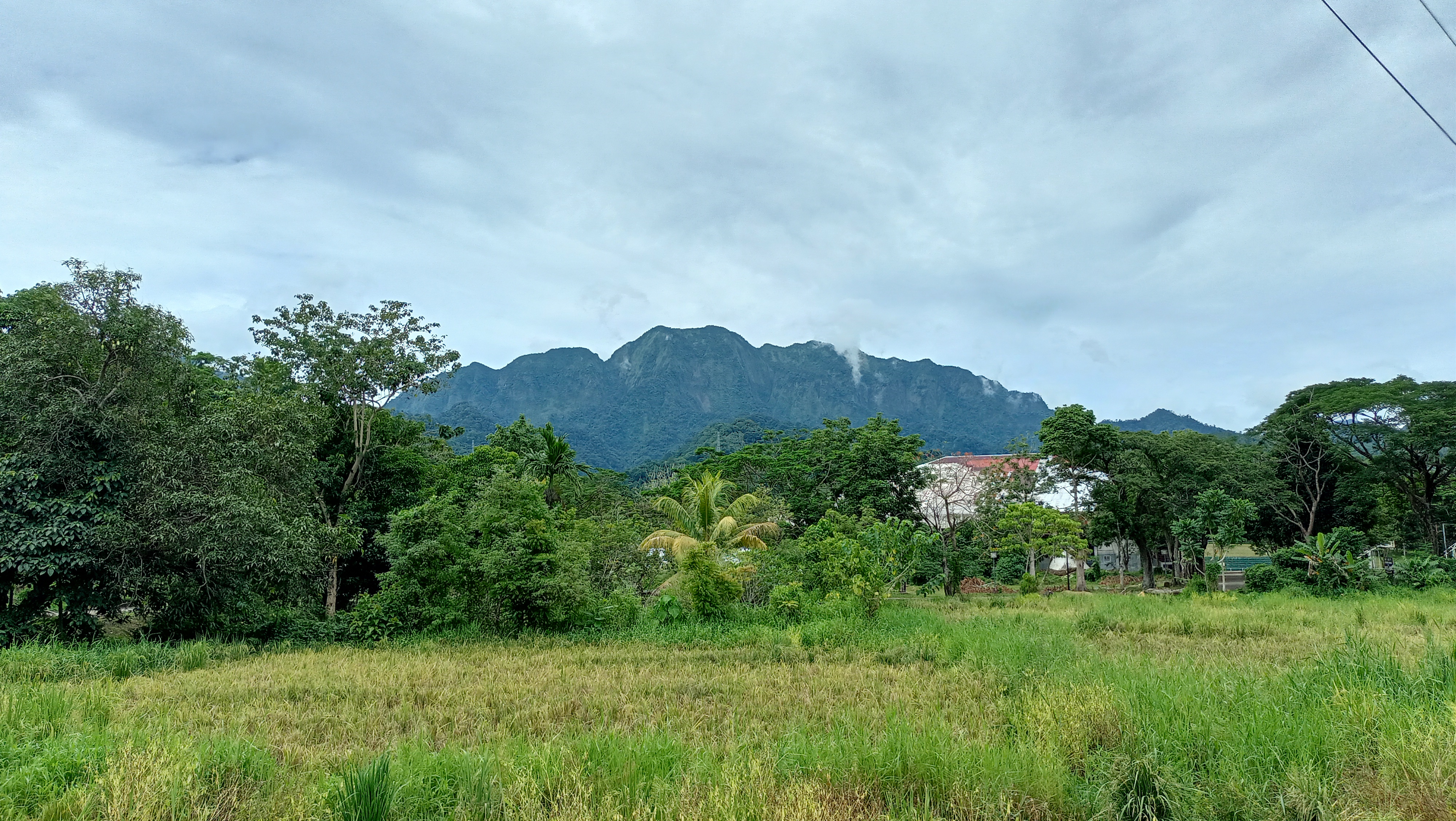
- View from the Visayas State University main campus

Highest point
- Elevation: 1,150 m (3,770 ft)

Geography
- Location within Philippines
- Location: Leyte
- Country: Philippines
- Region: Eastern Visayas
- Province: Leyte
- Range coordinates: 10°43′45″N 124°54′30″E

Mount Pangasugan is a mountain in the province of Leyte in the Philippines. It is approximately 1,150 metres (3,770 ft) tall, and located to the north of the city of Baybay. The mountain is densely vegetated, very steep, and home to a remarkable number of plant and animal species. It has been called "the last forest frontier in Eastern Visayas." Mt. Pangasugan Ecopark is situated in the virgin rain forest of the mountain.

== Ecological diversity ==
A study by the Visayas State University (VSU) in Baybay City, Leyte, found many animal species listed by the World Conservation Union in the Red List of Threatened Animals (IUCN Red List), including the Philippine tarsier, Philippine flying fox, and Fischer's pygmy fruit bat. New records of the microbat (Hipposideros obscurus), with a length of 5.5 centimeters and body weight of 10 grams; a type of skink (Tropidophorus grayi); and two new species of the Gobiidae fishes (Stiphodon olivaceus and Stiphodon surrufus) were also found by the VSU survey.

VSU's Natural History Museum collected 43,000 arthropod specimens from 377 families and 500 genera on Mt. Pangasugan. A new species of orchid (Dendrobium milaniae) and a tiger beetle (Thopeutica milaniae) were named in honor of VSU president Dr. Paciencia Po-Milan, a renowned ecologist.

Other endemic species include the eagle-owl, Philippine hawk-eagle, rufous-lored kingfisher, Philippine leafbird and miniature tit-babbler and flying lemur.

The Federal Republic of Germany (through the ViSCA-GTZ Applied Tropical EcologyProgranl, ViSCA, Baybay, Leyte, Philippines International) funded the VSU study to collect, identify, describe and document the existing species of aroids (Araceae) and orchids in Mt. Pangasugan. Twenty-five species of aroids representing 12 genera were documented at elevations of up to 350 m ASL. Classified as erect ground dwellers or climbers, the most dominant aroid belong to Pothos and Epipremnum. The orchid species represent 16 genera, with the most dominant belonging to Phalaenopsis.

The herpetofauna (herps) of Anibong, Jordan, Mt. Pangasugan Range, Leyte, is a habitat to endemic species, which is so diverse and slightly distributed. The Mindanao State University-Iligan Institute of Technology identified 17 herpetofaunal species belonging to 6 families (Ranidae, Rhacophoridae, Agamidae, Scincidae, Colubridae, Viperidae), of which eight (47%) are endemics (Endemism). These endemic species include Limnonectes magnus, Platymantis corrugatus, Platymantis dorsalis, Brachymeles samarensis, Draco lineatus, Sphenomorphus jagori, Rhabdophis lineata and Trimeresurus flavomaculatus. Limnonectes magnus is already in the near-threatened category.
