= Platymantis megabotoniviti =

Platymantis megabotoniviti Temporal range: Pleistocene–Holocene

Conservation status
- Extinct

Scientific classification
- Domain: Eukaryota
- Kingdom: Animalia
- Phylum: Chordata
- Class: Amphibia
- Order: Anura
- Family: Ceratobatrachidae
- Genus: Platymantis
- Species: †P. megabotoniviti

Binomial name
- †Platymantis megabotoniviti Worthy, 2001

Extinct species of amphibian

Platymantis megabotoniviti is an extinct species of frogs in the family Ceratobatrachidae. The species was described from bones of late Quaternary age from caves on Viti Levu, Fiji. P. megabotoniviti is much larger than the other two species of Platymantis known from Fiji, P. vitianus and P. vitiensis.

This frog was larger than other frogs in the genus Platymantis. Scientists have dated their extinction to after the arrival of humans in Fiji and speculate that it may have fallen prey to invasive rodents.
