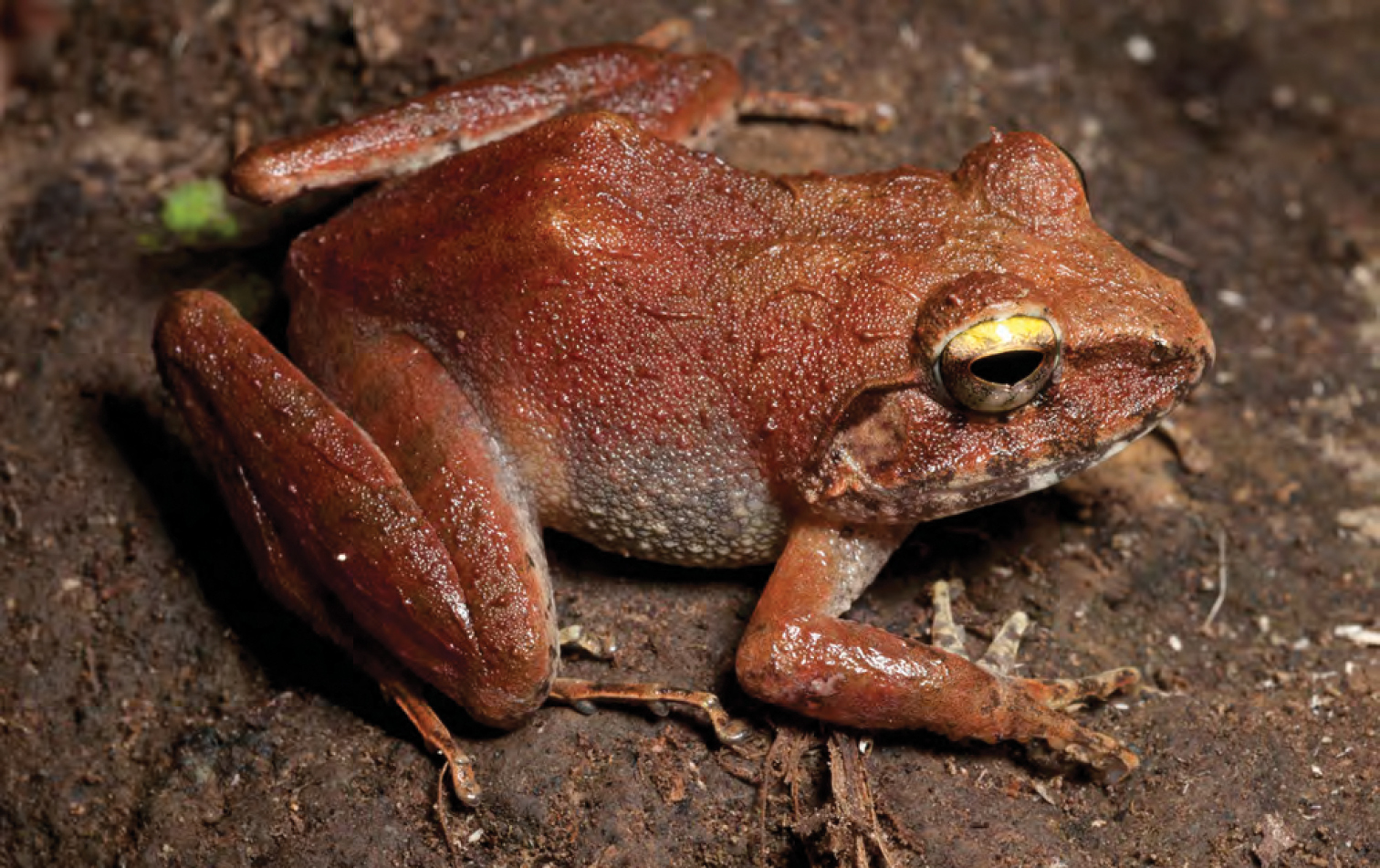

Conservation status
- Near Threatened (IUCN 3.1)

Scientific classification
- Kingdom: Animalia
- Phylum: Chordata
- Class: Amphibia
- Order: Anura
- Family: Ceratobatrachidae
- Genus: Platymantis
- Species: P. cagayanensis

Binomial name
- Platymantis cagayanensis Brown, Alcala & Diesmos, 1999

= Platymantis cagayanensis =

Species of frog

Platymantis cagayanensis is a species of frog in the family Ceratobatrachidae. It is endemic to the Philippines, where it is found along the north coast of Luzon Island and on Palaui Island. It has been observed as high as 200 meters above sea level.

Its natural habitats are subtropical or tropical moist lowland forest and subtropical or tropical moist montane forest. It is threatened by habitat loss.

The adult male frog measures about 26.4–30.8 mm in snout-vent length and the adult female frog about 34.7–37.4 long. The frog is brown in color with dark spots, dark bars behind the eyes, and dark bars on the hind legs.
