= Platymantis spelaeus =

Conservation status
- Endangered (IUCN 3.1)

Scientific classification
- Kingdom: Animalia
- Phylum: Chordata
- Class: Amphibia
- Order: Anura
- Family: Ceratobatrachidae
- Genus: Platymantis
- Species: P. spelaeus

Binomial name
- Platymantis spelaeus Brown and Alcala, 1982

Synonyms
- Platymantis spelaea — Günther, 1999 (incorrect subsequent spelling)

Species of amphibian

Platymantis spelaeus, also known as the Negros cave frog or cave wrinkled ground frog, is a species of frog in the family Ceratobatrachidae. It is endemic to the Philippines, where it is only found in the forested limestone areas of southern Negros. It is one of the two cave-dwelling Platymantis species, the other one being Platymantis insulatus.

== Description ==
Adult males measure 42–47 mm (1.7–1.9 in) and adult females 53–61 mm (2.1–2.4 in) in snout–vent length. The snout is broadly rounded. The tympanum is relatively large. The fingers and toes bear discs. The fingers are slender and have no webbing, whereas the toes are slightly webbed at base. Dorsal skin is rough (shagreened). The dorsum is olive-green to brown with darker mottling. The upper surfaces of the thighs have dark bars; the inner surfaces are orange or lavender. The venter is cream and may have brown flecks.

== Habitat and conservation ==
Platymantis spelaeus live in limestone karst and caves in forested limestone areas at elevations of 20–400 m (66–1,312 ft) above sea level. They can be very common and abundant during the rainy season, but are rarely encountered during the dry season. Development is direct (i.e., there is no free-living larval stage).

This species is threatened by habitat loss caused by shifting agriculture, human encroachment, guano mining, and the quarrying of limestone. The type locality is inside the Tiyabanan Banio community-based conservation area.
