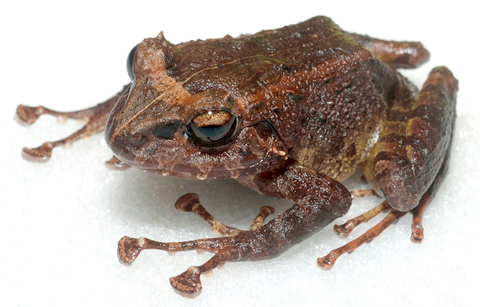

Conservation status
- Least Concern (IUCN 3.1)

Scientific classification
- Kingdom: Animalia
- Phylum: Chordata
- Class: Amphibia
- Order: Anura
- Family: Ceratobatrachidae
- Genus: Platymantis
- Species: P. rabori

Binomial name
- Platymantis rabori Brown, Alcala, Diesmos & Alcala, 1997

= Rabor's forest frog =

Species of amphibian

The Rabor's forest frog (Platymantis rabori) is a species of frog in the family Ceratobatrachidae. It is endemic to the southern Philippines, where it occurs in the rainforests of Bohol, Leyte, and Mindanao islands. Scientists have seen it between 300 and 1400 meters above sea level.

Its natural habitats are subtropical or tropical dry forest, subtropical or tropical moist lowland forest, and subtropical or tropical moist montane forest. It is threatened by habitat loss.
