= Kula WILD Adventure Park =

Kula WILD Adventure Park (Formerly Kula Eco Park)
- Interactive map of Kula WILD Adventure Park (Formerly Kula Eco Park)
- 18.20°S 177.68°E
- Date opened: January 1997
- Location: Korotogo, Sigatoka, Fiji
- Major exhibits: Fiji crested iguana Fiji ground frog Pacific black duck
- Website: http://www.fijiwild.com

Kula WILD Adventure Park is Fiji's biggest Family Fun Park and an ecological preserve in Fiji. It is located on Fiji's largest island, Viti Levu, in Korotogo near Sigatoka. The area was originally established as a bird park in the 1980s, but was bought by Kula Management in January 1997. With an extensive system of walkways through the park, and a wide range of attractions, the park is now a popular tourist attraction.

== About the park ==
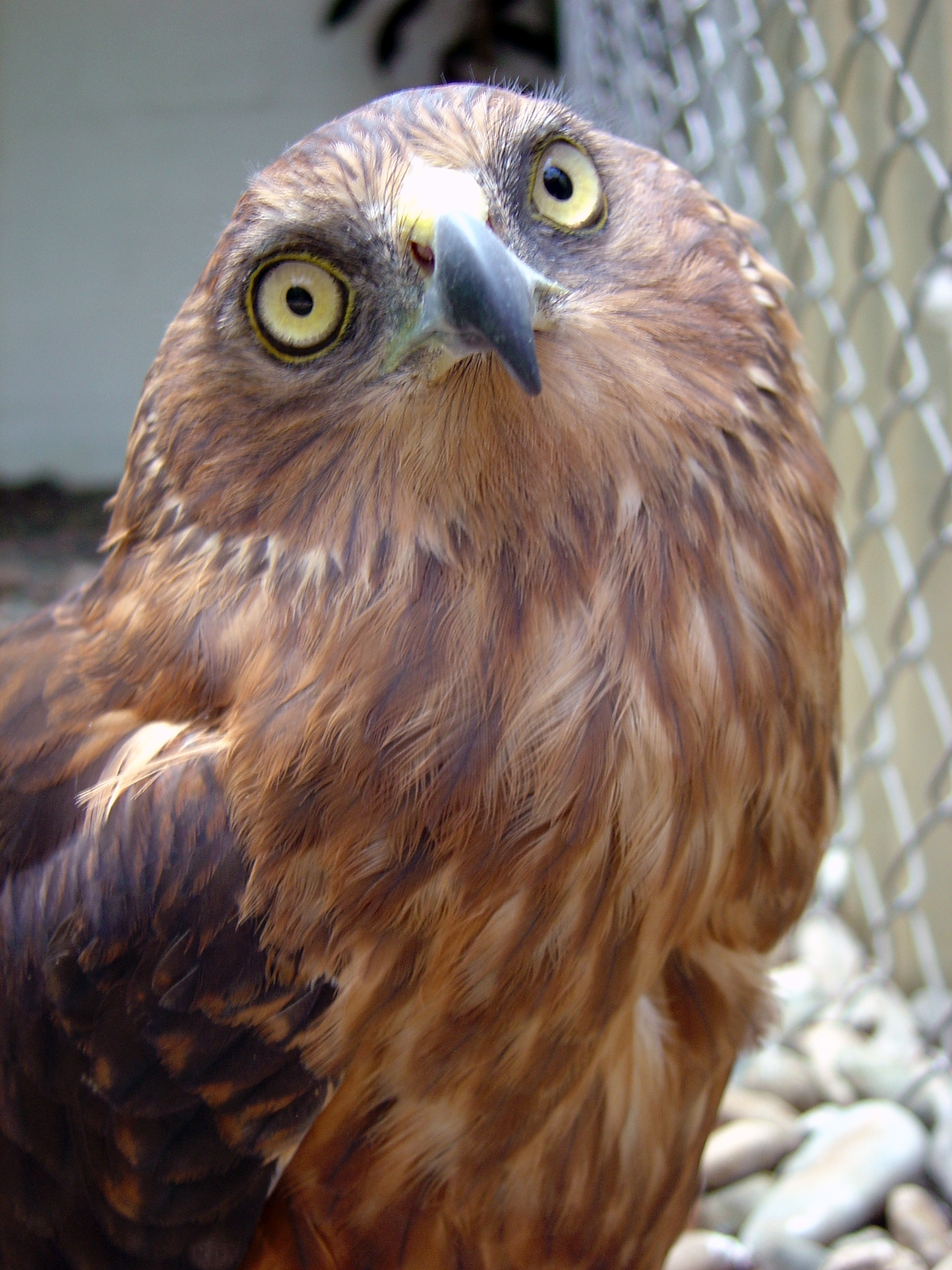
Swamp harrier at the zoo

The park is privately owned and operated. Its main focus is on providing fun rides and attractions for every member of the family. It is also active in the preservation of Fiji's indigenous flora and fauna, including reptiles, bird life, amphibians, tropical fish, the Fiji flying fox (Fiji's only native mammal), insects, butterflies and a wide range of trees and shrubs. The park has also won Fiji's 'Excellence in Tourism' award five times since 1996. In addition, the park strives to increase environmental issue awareness and educate local children in conservation. The park regularly offers free classes in which children may learn about Fiji's environment, pollution, and conservation. More than 8000 children have taken these classes.

== History ==
In 1998, 140 flora species were cataloged in a joint project between Kula Eco Park, the National Trust of Fiji, the Zoological Parks Board of New South Wales, and the Zoo Friends of Taronga Zoo. The park has established a captive breeding program for the critically endangered Fiji crested iguana and Fiji banded iguana.

In 2004, the park achieved two milestones with the world's first captive birth of a Kadavu musk parrot and the park's first birth of a Pacific black duck.

In 2007, (in cooperation with the Biological Sciences Division at the University of the South Pacific) the park commenced a captive breeding program for the endangered Fiji ground frog.

== Partners ==
Kula Eco Park works with a number of organizations to support Fiji and wildlife. They include the National Trust of Fiji, the Endangered Species Recovery Council of San Diego, and the Zoological Parks Board of New South Wales. Kula Eco Park is an honorary associate of the Royal Zoological Society of South Australia.
