= Platymantis luzonensis =

Conservation status
- Near Threatened (IUCN 3.1)

Scientific classification
- Kingdom: Animalia
- Phylum: Chordata
- Class: Amphibia
- Order: Anura
- Family: Ceratobatrachidae
- Genus: Platymantis
- Species: P. luzonensis

Binomial name
- Platymantis luzonensis Brown, Alcala, Diesmos & Alcala, 1997

Species of frog

Platymantis luzonensis is a species of frog in the family Ceratobatrachidae. It is endemic to the rainforest of southeastern Luzon, Philippines. It has been observed about 600 meters above sea level.

Its natural habitats are subtropical or tropical moist lowland forest, subtropical or tropical moist montane forest, rural gardens, and heavily degraded former forest. It is threatened by habitat loss.
