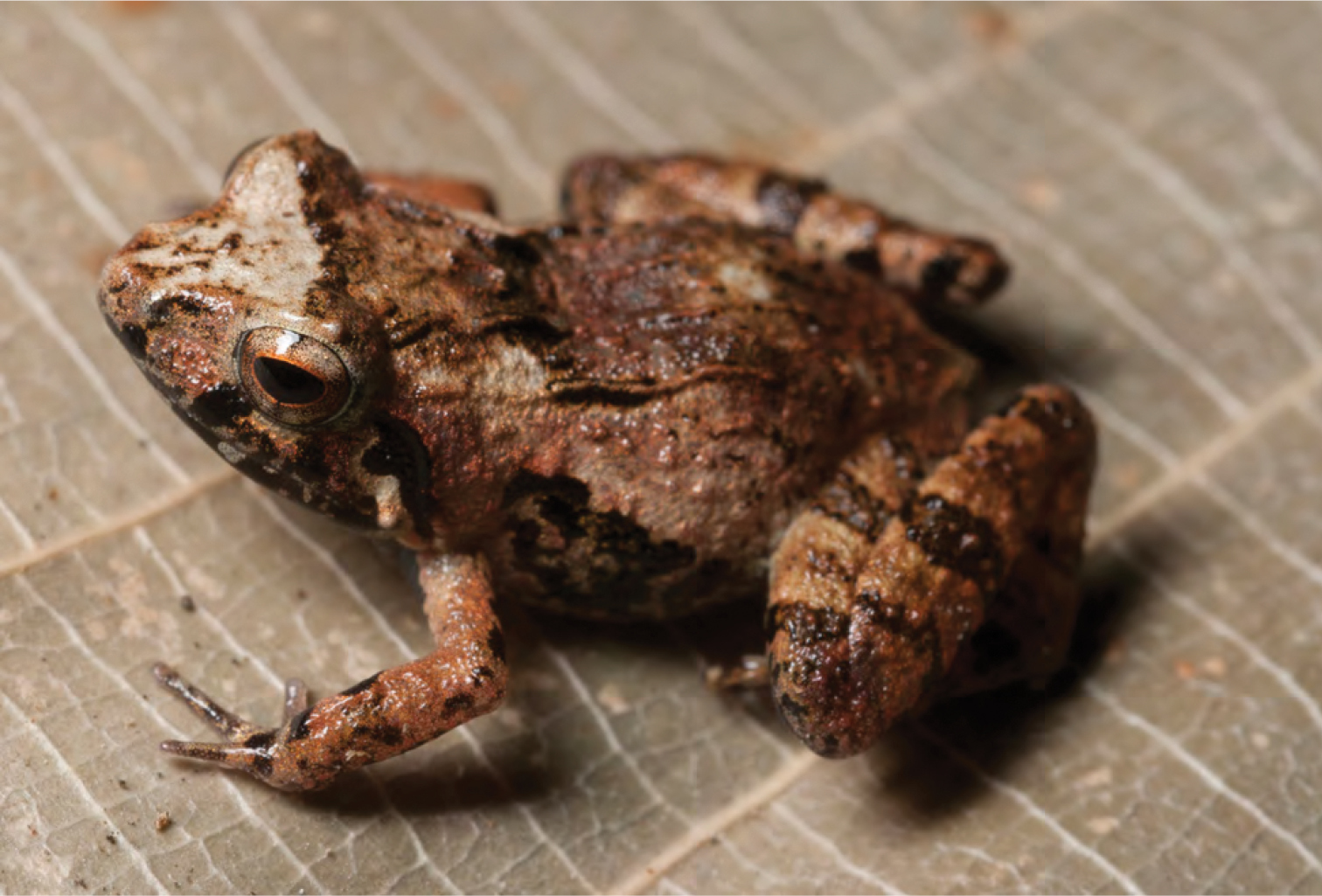

Conservation status
- Least Concern (IUCN 3.1)

Scientific classification
- Kingdom: Animalia
- Phylum: Chordata
- Class: Amphibia
- Order: Anura
- Family: Ceratobatrachidae
- Genus: Platymantis
- Species: P. pygmaeus

Binomial name
- Platymantis pygmaeus Alcala, Brown & Diesmos, 1998

Synonyms
- Platymantis pygmaea (unjustified emendation)

= Pygmy forest frog =

Species of amphibian

The pygmy forest frog (Platymantis pygmaeus) is a species of frog in the family Ceratobatrachidae. It is endemic to the Philippines. It occurs in the Central Cordilleras and Sierra Madres of northern Luzon, and possibly also on Sibuyan Island. Scientists have seen it between 400 and 1000 meters above sea level.

Its natural habitats are subtropical or tropical dry forest, subtropical or tropical moist lowland forest, and subtropical or tropical moist montane forest. It is threatened by habitat loss.
