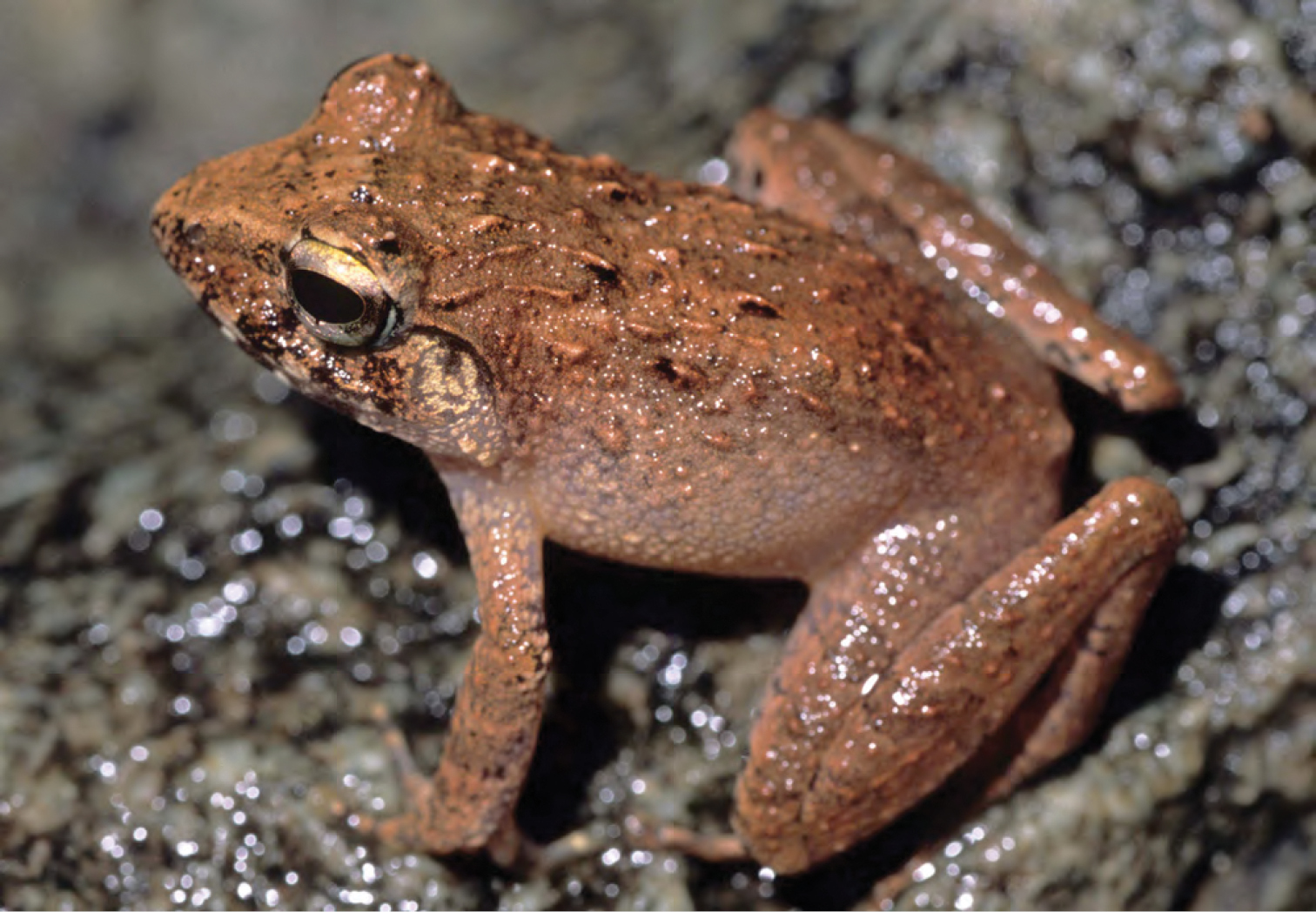

Conservation status
- Vulnerable (IUCN 3.1)

Scientific classification
- Kingdom: Animalia
- Phylum: Chordata
- Class: Amphibia
- Order: Anura
- Family: Ceratobatrachidae
- Genus: Platymantis
- Species: P. taylori

Binomial name
- Platymantis taylori Brown, Alcala, and Diesmos, 1999

= Platymantis taylori =

Species of amphibian

Platymantis taylori is a species of frogs in the family Ceratobatrachidae. It is endemic to the Philippines and is known from the Sierra Madre of northeastern Luzon. It has been observed between 100 and 400 meters above sea level.

== Appearance ==
The adult male frog measures about 26.6–33.0 mm in snout-vent length and the adult female frog about 30.7 to 39.8 mm. There is no webbed skin on the front feet and only a small amount of webbed skin on the hind feet. The skin of the dorsum is brown or gray-brown in color, with black spots.

== Etymology ==
The specific name taylori honors Edward Harrison Taylor (1889–1978), an American herpetologist.

== Habitat and conservation ==
Its natural habitats are lower montane and lowland forests where it lives in the forest floor stratum. It breeds and makes its nest in leaf-litter. It is threatened by habitat loss caused by agriculture and logging.
