= Smooth-skinned forest frog =

Conservation status
- Endangered (IUCN 3.1)

Scientific classification
- Kingdom: Animalia
- Phylum: Chordata
- Class: Amphibia
- Order: Anura
- Family: Ceratobatrachidae
- Genus: Platymantis
- Species: P. levigatus

Binomial name
- Platymantis levigatus Brown & Alcala, 1974

Species of amphibian

The smooth-skinned forest frog (Platymantis levigatus) is a species of frog in the family Ceratobatrachidae. It is endemic to Romblon, Philippines. It occurs on Sibuyan Island, and may also occur on other nearby islands.

Its natural habitats are subtropical or tropical dry forest, subtropical or tropical moist lowland forest, and subtropical or tropical moist montane forest. It has been observedbetween 800 and 900 meters above sea level. It is threatened by habitat loss.
