= Banahaw (disambiguation) =

Mount Banahaw or simply Banahaw, is a mountain in the Philippines.

Banahaw or Banahao may also refer to:

- Banahao forest frog, species of amphibian
- Banahao shrew-rat, species of rodent
- Banahaw Broadcasting Corporation, a defunct Philippine television network
- Banahaw tree mouse, species of rodent
- USLHT Banahao, a United States Lighthouse Service tender
