= Platymantis pseudodorsalis =

Conservation status
- Near Threatened (IUCN 3.1)

Scientific classification
- Kingdom: Animalia
- Phylum: Chordata
- Class: Amphibia
- Order: Anura
- Family: Ceratobatrachidae
- Genus: Platymantis
- Species: P. pseudodorsalis

Binomial name
- Platymantis pseudodorsalis Brown, Alcala & Diesmos, 1999

Species of frog

Platymantis pseudodorsalis is a species of frog in the family Ceratobatrachidae. It is endemic to Mount Banahaw, Philippines. Scientists have only seen it on one mountain between 1350 and 1500 meters above sea level.

Its natural habitats are subtropical or tropical moist lowland forest and subtropical or tropical moist montane forest. It is threatened by habitat loss.
