= Platymantis sierramadrensis =

Conservation status
- Vulnerable (IUCN 3.1)

Scientific classification
- Kingdom: Animalia
- Phylum: Chordata
- Class: Amphibia
- Order: Anura
- Family: Ceratobatrachidae
- Genus: Platymantis
- Species: P. sierramadrensis

Binomial name
- Platymantis sierramadrensis Brown, Alcala, Ong & Diesmos, 1999

Species of frog

Platymantis sierramadrensis is a species of frog in the family Ceratobatrachidae. It is endemic to the Sierra Madre of northeastern Luzon, Philippines. It has been observed in forests between 600 and 1200 meters above sea level.

Its natural habitats are subtropical or tropical dry forest, subtropical or tropical moist lowland forest, and subtropical or tropical moist montane forest. It is threatened by habitat loss.
