= Malinao =

Malinao may refer to one of several places in the Philippines:

- Malinao, Aklan, a municipality
- Malinao, Albay, a municipality
- Malinao, Tubajon, Dinagat Islands, a barangay
- Malinao Volcano, a potentially active volcano located in the Bicol Region of the Philippines
