= Platymantis lawtoni =

Conservation status
- Endangered (IUCN 3.1)

Scientific classification
- Kingdom: Animalia
- Phylum: Chordata
- Class: Amphibia
- Order: Anura
- Family: Ceratobatrachidae
- Genus: Platymantis
- Species: P. lawtoni

Binomial name
- Platymantis lawtoni Brown & Alcala, 1974

Species of amphibian

Platymantis lawtoni is an endangered species of frog in the family Ceratobatrachidae. It is endemic to Romblon, Philippines. It occurs in the rainforests of Romblon, Tablas, and Sibuyan Islands. It has been observed between 800 and 1200 meters above sea level.

Its natural habitats are subtropical or tropical dry forest, subtropical or tropical moist lowland forest and subtropical or tropical moist montane forest. It is threatened by habitat loss.
