= Platymantis indeprensus =

Conservation status
- Near Threatened (IUCN 3.1)

Scientific classification
- Kingdom: Animalia
- Phylum: Chordata
- Class: Amphibia
- Order: Anura
- Family: Ceratobatrachidae
- Genus: Platymantis
- Species: P. indeprensus

Binomial name
- Platymantis indeprensus Brown, Alcala & Diesmos, 1999

Species of amphibian

Platymantis indeprensus is a species of frogs in the family Ceratobatrachidae.

It is endemic to Mount Banahaw, Philippines. It has been observed between 600 and 1400 meters above sea level. Its natural habitats are subtropical or tropical moist lowland forest and subtropical or tropical moist montane forest. It is threatened by habitat loss.

The adult male frog measures about 21.5–27.3 mm in snout-vent length. There is no webbed skin on the front feet and only a small amount on the hind feet. The skin on dorsum is black-brown in color, sometimes with a lighter stripe.
