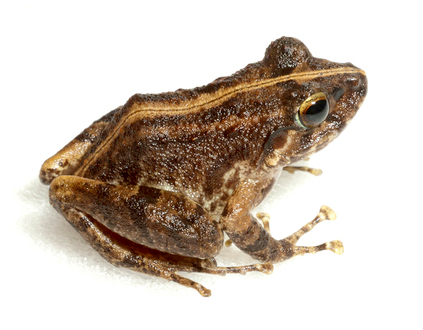

Conservation status
- Least Concern (IUCN 3.1)

Scientific classification
- Kingdom: Animalia
- Phylum: Chordata
- Class: Amphibia
- Order: Anura
- Family: Ceratobatrachidae
- Genus: Platymantis
- Species: P. guentheri

Binomial name
- Platymantis guentheri (Boulenger, 1882)

Synonyms
- Cornufer ingeri Brown & Alcala, 1963

= Platymantis guentheri =

Species of frog

Platymantis guentheri is a species of frog in the family Ceratobatrachidae. It is endemic to the Philippines, where it occurs in the rainforests of Leyte, Biliran, Maripipi, Bohol, Panglao, Dinagat, and Mindanao islands. Its natural habitats are subtropical or tropical moist lowland forest, subtropical or tropical moist montane forest, plantations, rural gardens, and heavily degraded former forest. It has been observed as high as 700 meters above sea level.

The adult male frog measures about 24 mm in snout-vent length and the adult female frog about 27 mm. The skin of the dorsum is bumpy rather than smooth, and the head and snout are narrow. This frog has vomerine teeth in its jaw. It has disks on its toes for climbing. The disks on its front feet are larger than the ones on its hind feet. The skin of the dorsum is dark in color with marks, and there is a stripe down each side. The ventrum is light in color and can have brown spots.

These terrestrial frogs tend to spend time in epiphyte plants that grow on tree branches, on tree trunks, and on the forest floor. The female lays her eggs in water collected in these epiphytes or on leaves. This frog undergoes direct development, hatching as a froglet rather than a tadpole.

Although not specifically endangered, this species is threatened by habitat loss. Scientists attribute this to deforestation associated with logging and agriculture.
