= Cyrtodactylus gubaot =

Scientific classification
- Kingdom: Animalia
- Phylum: Chordata
- Class: Reptilia
- Order: Squamata
- Suborder: Gekkota
- Family: Gekkonidae
- Genus: Cyrtodactylus
- Species: C. gubaot

Binomial name
- Cyrtodactylus gubaot Welton, Siler, Linkem, Diesmos & Brown, 2010

Gecko endemic to the Philippines

Cyrtodactylus gubaot is a species of gecko that is endemic to Leyte in the Philippines.
