= Platymantis diesmosi =

Conservation status
- Endangered (IUCN 3.1)

Scientific classification
- Kingdom: Animalia
- Phylum: Chordata
- Class: Amphibia
- Order: Anura
- Family: Ceratobatrachidae
- Genus: Platymantis
- Species: P. diesmosi

Binomial name
- Platymantis diesmosi Brown and Gonzalez, 2007

Species of amphibian

Platymantis diesmosi is a species of frogs that was first described by Brown and Gonzalez in 2007. It is endemic to the Philippines and is found on Malinao Volcano.

== Distribution and habitat ==
Platymantis diesmosi has only been found on Malinao Volcano in the Bicol Region of the Philippines at elevations of 900 and 1,160 m (2,950 and 3,810 ft) above mean sea level, where it is common. The International Union for Conservation of Nature has classed the species as "Data Deficient" because it was described recently and not much data has been collected. The species has been found between 30 and 40 metres (98 and 131 ft) away from water, and on cliff edges.

== Description ==
Females have a snout-vent length of 49.8 to 52.7 mm (1.96 to 2.07 in), while the corresponding measurement for males is 28.3 to 39.1 mm (1.11 to 1.54 in). The tip of the snout extends just over the lower jaw and is pointed bluntly. The arms are slender and the fingers are long and black with brown-gold spots. The lips are swollen. The pupil of the eye is horizontally elliptical. P. diesmosi is mainly dark brown and has irregular darker markings and/or minuscule white patches. Specimens are sometimes almost totally black and brown with golden highlights. Golden patches can be found on the head, and its limbs are mainly golden-brown. The throat colour ranges from cream to dark brown, and the chest and stomach are also variably coloured, from dark brown with white patches to cream.
