= Mount Data forest frog =

Mt. Data forest frog

Conservation status
- Endangered (IUCN 3.1)

Scientific classification
- Kingdom: Animalia
- Phylum: Chordata
- Class: Amphibia
- Order: Anura
- Family: Ceratobatrachidae
- Genus: Platymantis
- Species: P. subterrestris

Binomial name
- Platymantis subterrestris (Taylor, 1922)

Species of amphibian

The Mount Data forest frog (Platymantis subterrestris) is a species of frog in the family Ceratobatrachidae. It is endemic to the Cordillera Central of northern Luzon, Philippines. Its type locality is Mount Data. It has been observed between 1850 and 2200 meters above sea level in the mountains in Luzon.

Its natural habitat is subtropical or tropical moist montane forest. It is threatened by habitat loss.
