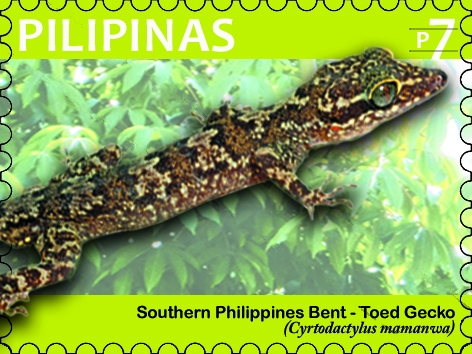

Scientific classification
- Kingdom: Animalia
- Phylum: Chordata
- Class: Reptilia
- Order: Squamata
- Suborder: Gekkota
- Family: Gekkonidae
- Genus: Cyrtodactylus
- Species: C. mamanwa

Binomial name
- Cyrtodactylus mamanwa Welton, Siler, Linkem, Diesmos & Brown, 2010

Synonyms
- Gymnodactylus agusanensis

= Cyrtodactylus mamanwa =

Species of lizard

Cyrtodactylus mamanwa is a species of gecko endemic to the Philippines. It was identified in 2010 from a sample collected in 2007 on the Dinagat Island and named after the Mamanwa indigenous group. It is also found on Siargao and nearby islands. Adults reach a total body length of ca. 19 cm. This gecko feeds mostly on insects and spends most of its life on trees. Females lay two brittle eggs under barks of trees or inside tree cavities.
