= Platymantis mimulus =

Conservation status
- Least Concern (IUCN 3.1)

Scientific classification
- Kingdom: Animalia
- Phylum: Chordata
- Class: Amphibia
- Order: Anura
- Family: Ceratobatrachidae
- Genus: Platymantis
- Species: P. mimulus

Binomial name
- Platymantis mimulus Brown, Alcala & Diesmos, 1997

Species of amphibian

Platymantis mimulus, commonly known as the Japanese bullet frog, is a species of frog in the family Ceratobatrachidae. It is endemic to the Philippines, where it occurs on Mount Makiling and vicinity. It has been observed as high as 400 meters above sea level.

Its natural habitats are subtropical or tropical dry forests, subtropical or tropical moist lowland forests, subtropical or tropical moist montane forests, pastureland, plantations, rural gardens, and heavily degraded former forest.
