= Cyrtodactylus jambangan =

Scientific classification
- Kingdom: Animalia
- Phylum: Chordata
- Class: Reptilia
- Order: Squamata
- Suborder: Gekkota
- Family: Gekkonidae
- Genus: Cyrtodactylus
- Species: C. jambangan

Binomial name
- Cyrtodactylus jambangan Welton, Siler, Diesmos, & Brown, 2010

Gecko endemic to the Philippines

Cyrtodactylus jambangan is a species of gecko that is endemic to the Philippines.
