= Platymantis montanus =

Conservation status
- Vulnerable (IUCN 3.1)

Scientific classification
- Kingdom: Animalia
- Phylum: Chordata
- Class: Amphibia
- Order: Anura
- Family: Ceratobatrachidae
- Genus: Platymantis
- Species: P. montanus

Binomial name
- Platymantis montanus (Taylor, 1922)

Synonyms
- Cornufer montanus Taylor, 1922; Platymantis montana (Taylor, 1922)

Species of frog

Platymantis montanus is a species of frog in the family Ceratobatrachidae. It is endemic to southwestern Luzon, the Philippines, and is known from its type locality, Mount Banahaw, and from Mount Apoy.

== Description ==
Adult males measure 24–28 mm (0.9–1.1 in) and adult females 26–29 mm (1.0–1.1 in) in snout–vent length. The snout is broadly rounded. The tympanum is distinct. The finger discs are larger than the toe discs. The toes are webbed, and the fingers may have some basal webbing. The dorsum is smooth, variegated gray-brown in color. There is a broad, cream yellow vertebral stripe from tip of snout to anus. The legs have dull cream to white bars. The flanks and the groin have large, bright, lemon yellow spots that separated by brown narrow lines. The belly and chin are pinkish tan, mottled with brown.

== Habitat and conservation ==
Platymantis montanus is an arboreal species found in mossy and montane rainforests. On Mount Banahaw, it occurs above 800 m (2,600 ft). The eggs are deposited in shrub layer vegetation, in tree ferns, aerial ferns, and Pandanus. Development is direct, without free-living tadpole stage.

Platymantis montanus is very common on Mount Banahaw. It is not facing direct threats but its small range makes it vulnerable. It occurs in the Mounts Banahaw–San Cristobal Protected Landscape.
