= Platymantis bayani =

Conservation status
- Data Deficient (IUCN 3.1)

Scientific classification
- Kingdom: Animalia
- Phylum: Chordata
- Class: Amphibia
- Order: Anura
- Family: Ceratobatrachidae
- Genus: Platymantis
- Species: P. bayani

Binomial name
- Platymantis bayani Siler, Alcala, Diesmos, and Brown, 2009

Species of frog

Platymantis bayani is a species of frog in the family Ceratobatrachidae. It is endemic to the island of Samar, the Philippines. It is only known from its type locality, the Taft Forest Reserve in Taft, Eastern Samar. The specific name bayani is derived from the Tagalog word meaning "highly respected", "heroic", or "hero". The name honors Walter C. Brown, in recognition of his "numerous contributions to Philippine herpetology and … lifelong commitment to the study of biodiversity in the SW Pacific." Accordingly, common name Walter's limestone forest frog has been proposed for this species.

== Description ==
Adult males measure 34–39 mm (1.3–1.5 in) and adult females 44–50 mm (1.7–2.0 in) in snout–vent length. The overall appearance is robust, and the head is broad. The tympanum is distinct. The fingers are slender, long, and bear greatly expanded terminal discs, as do the toes. The toes have some basal webbing. The dorsum and head are mottled light green, dark green, and black and bear low, salmon-colored tubercles. There is a distinct interorbital bar. The limbs have alternating dark brown and green transverse bars on their dorsal surfaces. The flanks have series of dark brown to black blotches and spots. The iris is mottled golden-brown and dark brown, with a bright gold ciliary ring surrounding the pupil.

== Habitat and conservation ==
Platymantis bayani is known from primary- and secondary growth forest on karst substrate at 140 m (460 ft) above sea level. Both males and females were observed perched on top of limestone rocks within large rock formations in the forest; they were well camouflaged against this background. This species has never been observed perching in trees or shrubs, as most closely related species do. Breeding is probably direct, with eggs presumably deposited in limestone crevices and small caves.

Platymantis bayani was quite common at the type locality. It is possible that it has a broader distribution, but its range is probably restricted by the presence of relatively undisturbed limestone formations with forest cover. It is primarily threatened by limestone quarrying and mining for the cement industry. Forest clearing for shifting agriculture, wood collection for firewood and charcoal production, and commercial illegal logging constitute additional threats.
