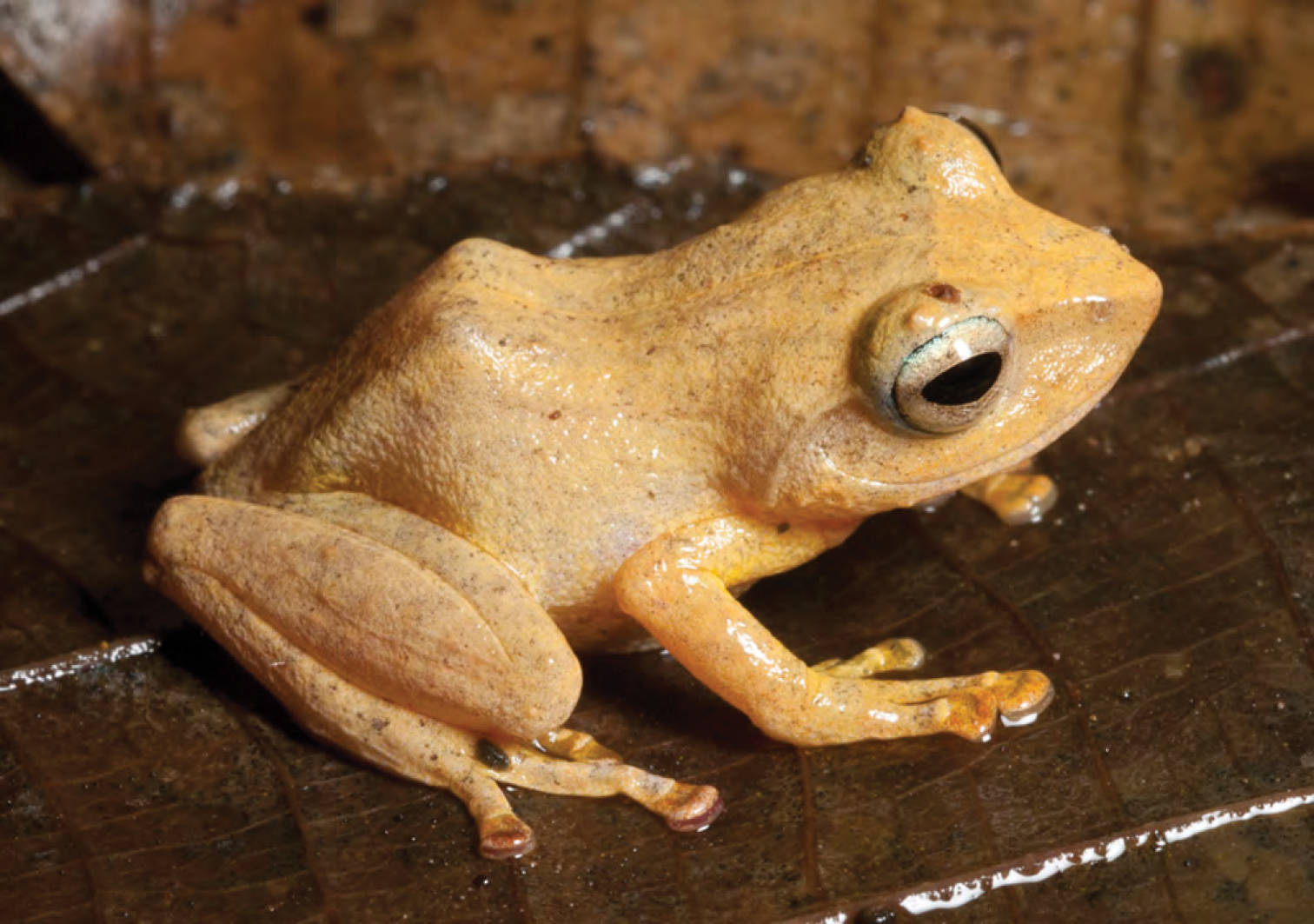

Conservation status
- Least Concern (IUCN 3.1)

Scientific classification
- Kingdom: Animalia
- Phylum: Chordata
- Class: Amphibia
- Order: Anura
- Family: Ceratobatrachidae
- Genus: Platymantis
- Species: P. polillensis

Binomial name
- Platymantis polillensis (Taylor, 1922)

= Polillo forest frog =

Species of amphibian

The Polillo forest frog (Platymantis polillensis) is a species of frog in the family Ceratobatrachidae. It is endemic to the Philippines, where it occurs on Polillo Island and the adjacent coast of Aurora Province, Luzon. It has been observed between 50 and 350 meters above sea level.

The name "Polillo" means "beautiful island with plenty of food". Locally, it is called "kabakab". The species of frog has previously been considered as critically endangered, as its habitat on Polillo Island had been razed for coconut farming, leaving only 4 square kilometers of land. But, after a researcher recognized its mating call on another island, it had been discovered that the Polillo forest frog was widespread across the Camarines Norte, Quezon, and Aurora provinces of Luzon.

The Polillo forest frog has a diet consisting of insects found on the island of Luzon and Polillo.

Its natural habitats are subtropical or tropical dry forest, subtropical or tropical moist lowland forest, and subtropical or tropical moist montane forest. It is threatened by habitat loss.
