= Arvin Cantor Diesmos =

Filipino herpetologist (born 1969)

- Born: June 4, 1969
- Education: University of the Philippines Los Baños; National University of Singapore
- Known for: Herpetology, discovery of new amphibian and reptile species
- Spouse: Mae Leonida
- Scientific career
- Fields: Biology, Zoology, Ecology, Conservation
- Workplaces: De La Salle University, Field Museum of Natural History

Arvin Cantor Diesmos (born 4 June 1969 in Manila, Luzon) is a Filipino biologist, zoologist, ecologist, and conservationist. His main research focus is herpetology, but he also studies birds and mammals.

== Biography ==
After earning a Bachelor of Science in 1992 and a Master of Science in 1998 (both in wildlife ecology at UPLB), Diesmos received his Ph.D. from the National University of Singapore in 2009. In 1995, he worked as a teaching assistant at UPLB. From 1998 to 2001, he was an assistant professor in the Department of Biological Sciences at De La Salle University, Campus Dasmariñas. From 2004 to 2007, he was a teaching assistant at the National University of Singapore. Since 2012, he has been an associate professor at De La Salle University, Manila.

Between 1990 and 1998, Diesmos worked as a field biologist for various institutions, including the UPLB Wildlife Laboratory (1990), the Philippine Department of Environment and Natural Resources and BirdLife International (1991–1993), the Japanese Wildlife Research Center (1992–1993), the Cincinnati Museum of Natural History and the National Museum of the Philippines (1993–1994), the Haribon Foundation (1996–1998), and the Research Institute for Tropical Medicine (1998). From 1999 to 2000, he served as a consulting herpetologist for the WWF in the United States. From 2000 to 2002, he worked as a herpetologist at the Field Museum of Natural History in Chicago. Since 2011, he has been an associate research scientist there. From 2011 to 2012, he was an associate research scientist at the Natural History Museum of the University of Kansas.

Diesmos has discovered several new species of frogs, lizards, and snakes throughout the Philippines. Species named in his honor include the frog Platymantis diesmosi (discovered in 2007 on Mount Malinao in the Bicol Region), the skink Parvoscincus arvindiesmos, and the earthworm Pheretima diesmosi. In 2001, he was part of the team that first described the Bukidnon woodcock (Scolopax bukidnonensis) along with Simon Harrap and Robert S. Kennedy.

== Memberships ==
Diesmos was president of the Wildlife Conservation Society of the Philippines from 2003 to 2006. From 2005 to 2008, he was a member of the IUCN SSC Tortoise and Freshwater Turtle Specialist Group. Since 2010, he has been a member of the IUCN Amphibian Red List Authority. Since 2011, he has been a member of the IUCN SSC Specialist Group on crocodiles. Since 2013, he has served on the board of Crocodylus Porosus Philippines and as president of the Philippine Association of Career Scientists.

== Species described by Diesmos ==
- Acutotyphlops banaorum Brown, Diesmos & Gee, 2007
- Brachymeles ilocandia Siler, Davis, Freitas, Huron, Geheber, Watters, Penrod, Papes, Amrein, Anwawr, Cooper Hein, Manning, Patel, Pinaroc, Diesmos, Diesmos, Oliveros & Brown, 2016
- Brachymeles lukbani Siler, Balete, Diesmos & Brown, 2010
- Brachymeles makusog Siler, Diesmos & Brown, 2010
- Brachymeles samad Siler, Jones, Diesmos, Diesmos & Brown, 2012
- Brachymeles tiboliorum Siler, Jones, Diesmos, Diesmos & Brown, 2012
- Brachymeles vulcani Siler, Jones, Diesmos, Diesmos & Brown, 2012
- Cornufer hedigeri Brown, Siler, Richards, Diesmos, and Cannatella, 2015
- Cyrtodactylus gubaot Welton, Siler, Linkem, Diesmos & Brown, 2010
- Cyrtodactylus jambangan Welton, Siler, Diesmos & Brown, 2010
- Cyrtodactylus mamanwa Welton, Siler, Linkem, Diesmos & Brown, 2010
- Cyrtodactylus sumuroi Welton, Siler, Linkem, Diesmos & Brown, 2010
- Cyrtodactylus tautbatorum Welton, Siler, Diesmos & Brown, 2009
- Eutropis caraga Barley, Diesmos, Siler, Martinez & Brown, 2020
- Eutropis cuprea Barley, Diesmos, Siler, Martinez & Brown, 2020
- Eutropis gubataas Barley, Diesmos, Siler, Martinez & Brown, 2020
- Eutropis islamaliit Barley, Diesmos, Siler, Martinez & Brown, 2020
- Eutropis lapulapu Barley, Diesmos, Siler, Martinez & Brown, 2020
- Eutropis palauensis Barley, Diesmos, Siler, Martinez & Brown, 2020
- Eutropis sahulinghangganan Barley, Diesmos, Siler, Martinez & Brown, 2020
- Eutropis sibalom Barley, Diesmos, Siler, Martinez & Brown, 2020
- Gekko carusadensis Linkem, Siler, Diesmos, Sy & Brown, 2010
- Gekko coi Brown, Siler, Oliveros, Diesmos & Alcala, 2011
- Gekko crombota Brown, Oliveros, Siler & Diesmos, 2008
- Gekko gulat Brown, Diesmos, Duya, Garcia & Rico, 2010
- Gekko rossi Brown, Oliveros, Siler & Diesmos, 2009
- Insulasaurus traanorum Linkem, Diesmos & Brown, 2010
- Liopeltis tiomanica Som, Grismer, Grismer, Wood, Quah, Brown, Diesmos, Weinell & Stuart, 2020
- Luperosaurus angliit Brown, Diesmos & Oliveros, 2011
- Luperosaurus kubli Brown, Diesmos & Duya, 2007
- Lygosoma tabonorum Heitz, Diesmos, Freitas, Ellsworth & Grismer, 2016
- Malayotyphlops andyi Wynn, Diesmos & Brown, 2016
- Malayotyphlops denrorum Wynn, Diesmos & Brown, 2016
- Parvoscincus boyingi Brown, Linkem, Diesmos, Balete, Duya & Ferner, 2010
- Parvoscincus duwendorum Siler, Linkem, Cobb, Watters, Cummings, Diesmos & Brown, 2014
- Parvoscincus hadros Brown, Linkem, Diesmos, Balete, Duya & Ferner, 2010
- Parvoscincus igorotorum Brown, Linkem, Diesmos, Balete, Duya & Ferner, 2010
- Parvoscincus manananggalae Siler, Linkem, Cobb, Watters, Cummings, Diesmos & Brown, 2014
- Parvoscincus tikbalangi Siler, Linkem, Cobb, Watters, Cummings, Diesmos & Brown, 2014
- Platymantis banahao Brown, Alcala, Diesmos & Alcala, 1997
- Platymantis bayani Siler, Alcala, Diesmos & Brown, 2009
- Platymantis biak Siler, Diesmos, Linkem, Diesmos & Brown, 2010
- Platymantis cagayanensis Brown, Alcala & Diesmos, 1999
- Platymantis indeprensus Brown, Alcala & Diesmos, 1999
- Platymantis luzonensis Brown, Alcala, Diesmos & Alcala, 1997
- Platymantis mimulus Brown, Alcala & Diesmos, 1997
- Platymantis naomii Alcala, Brown & Diesmos, 1998
- Platymantis negrosensis Brown, Alcala, Diesmos & Alcala, 1997
- Platymantis paengi Siler, Linkem, Diesmos & Alcala, 2007
- Platymantis pseudodorsalis Brown, Alcala & Diesmos, 1999
- Platymantis pygmaeus Alcala, Brown & Diesmos, 1998
- Platymantis rabori Brown, Alcala, Diesmos & Alcala, 1997
- Platymantis sierramadrensis Brown, Alcala, Ong & Diesmos, 1999
- Platymantis taylori Brown, Alcala & Diesmos, 1999
- Pseudogekko atiorum Davis, Watters, Köhler, Whitsett, Huron, Brown, Diesmos & Siler, 2015
- Pseudogekko chavacano Siler, Welton, Davis, Watters, Davey, Diesmos, Diesmos & Brown, 2014
- Pseudogekko ditoy Siler, Welton, Davis, Watters, Davey, Diesmos, Diesmos & Brown, 2014
- Pseudogekko isapa Siler, Davis, Diesmos, Guinto, Whitsett & Brown, 2016
- Pseudogekko pungkaypinit Siler, Welton, Davis, Watters, Davey, Diesmos, Diesmos & Brown, 2014
- Varanus bitatawa Welton, Siler, Bennett, Diesmos, Ruya, Dugay, Rico, Van Weerd & Brown, 2010
