= Negros forest frog =

Conservation status
- Near Threatened (IUCN 3.1)

Scientific classification
- Kingdom: Animalia
- Phylum: Chordata
- Class: Amphibia
- Order: Anura
- Family: Ceratobatrachidae
- Genus: Platymantis
- Species: P. negrosensis

Binomial name
- Platymantis negrosensis Brown, Alcala, Diesmos & Alcala, 1997

Species of amphibian

The Negros forest frog (Platymantis negrosensis) is a species of frog in the family Ceratobatrachidae. It is endemic to Panay and Negros, Philippines. It has been observed between 200 and 1800 meters above sea level.

== Appearance ==
This frog measures about 30–50 mm long in snout-vent length. It has large disks on its toes for climbing trees.

== Eggs ==
This frog is nocturnal and arboreal. The female frog lays eggs in fern plants that grow on trees. The eggs hatch into small froglets with no free-swimming tadpole stage.

== Threats ==
This species' natural habitats are subtropical or tropical moist lowland forest and subtropical or tropical moist montane forest. It is threatened by habitat loss. Scientists attribute this to deforestation associated with logging, agriculture, and grazing.
