= Naomi's forest frog =

Conservation status
- Near Threatened (IUCN 3.1)

Scientific classification
- Kingdom: Animalia
- Phylum: Chordata
- Class: Amphibia
- Order: Anura
- Family: Ceratobatrachidae
- Genus: Platymantis
- Species: P. naomii

Binomial name
- Platymantis naomii Alcala, Brown & Diesmos, 1998

Synonyms
- Platymantis naomiae (unjustified emendation)

Species of amphibian

The Naomi's forest frog (Platymantis naomii) is a species of frog in the family Ceratobatrachidae. It is endemic to Mount Banahaw, Philippines.

Its natural habitats are subtropical or tropical moist lowland forest and subtropical or tropical moist montane forest. It has been observed 1400 meters above sea level.
