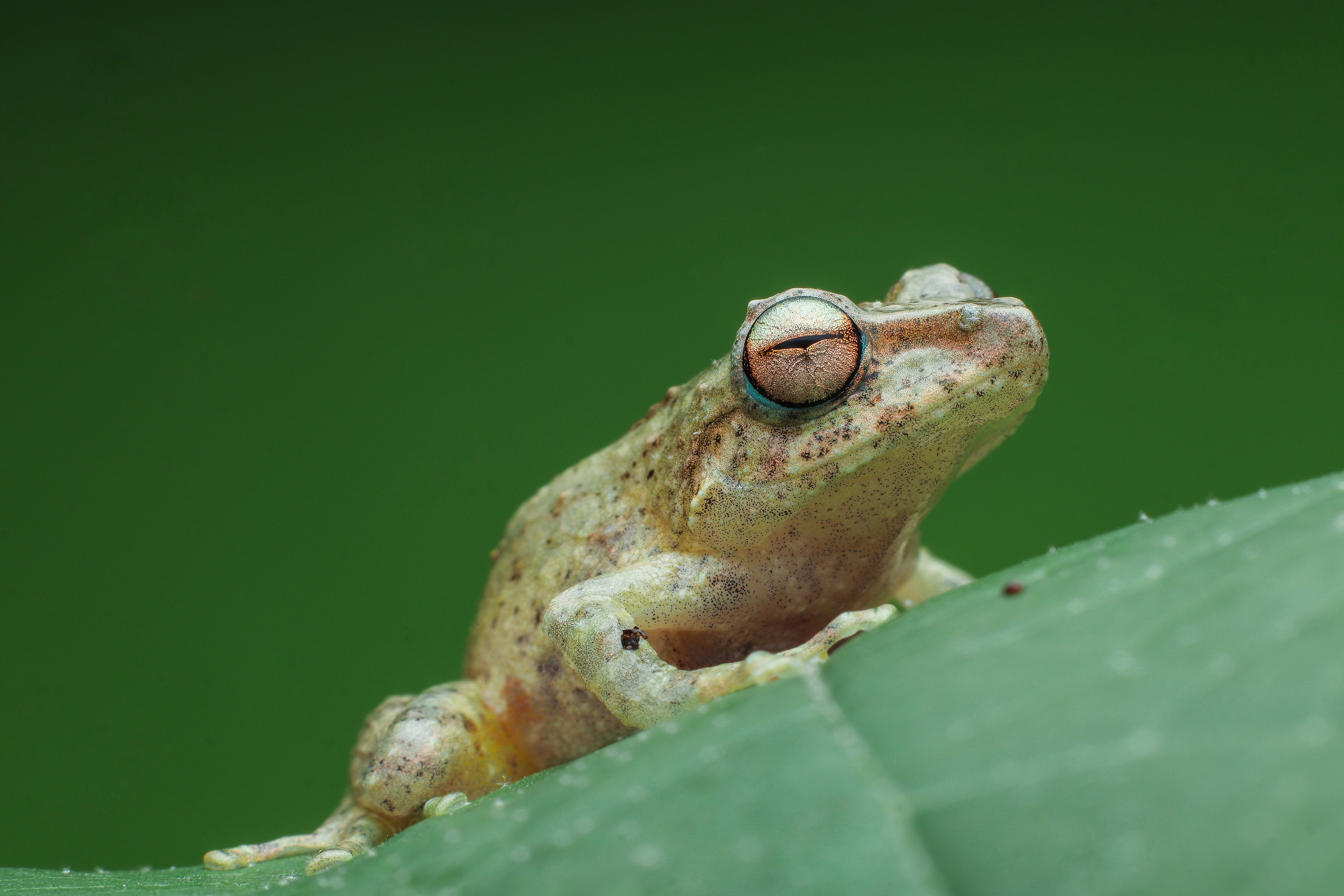

Conservation status
- Vulnerable (IUCN 3.1)

Scientific classification
- Kingdom: Animalia
- Phylum: Chordata
- Class: Amphibia
- Order: Anura
- Family: Ceratobatrachidae
- Genus: Platymantis
- Species: P. hazelae

Binomial name
- Platymantis hazelae (Taylor, 1920)

Synonyms
- Cornufer rivularis Taylor, 1922

= Hazel's forest frog =

Species of amphibian

The Hazel's forest frog (Platymantis hazelae) is a species of frog in the family Ceratobatrachidae. It is endemic to the Philippines, where it occurs on the mountains of Negros and possibly also Masbate.

Its natural habitats are subtropical or tropical moist lowland forest and subtropical or tropical moist montane forest. It has been observed between 600 and 1700 meters above sea level.

It is threatened by habitat loss.
