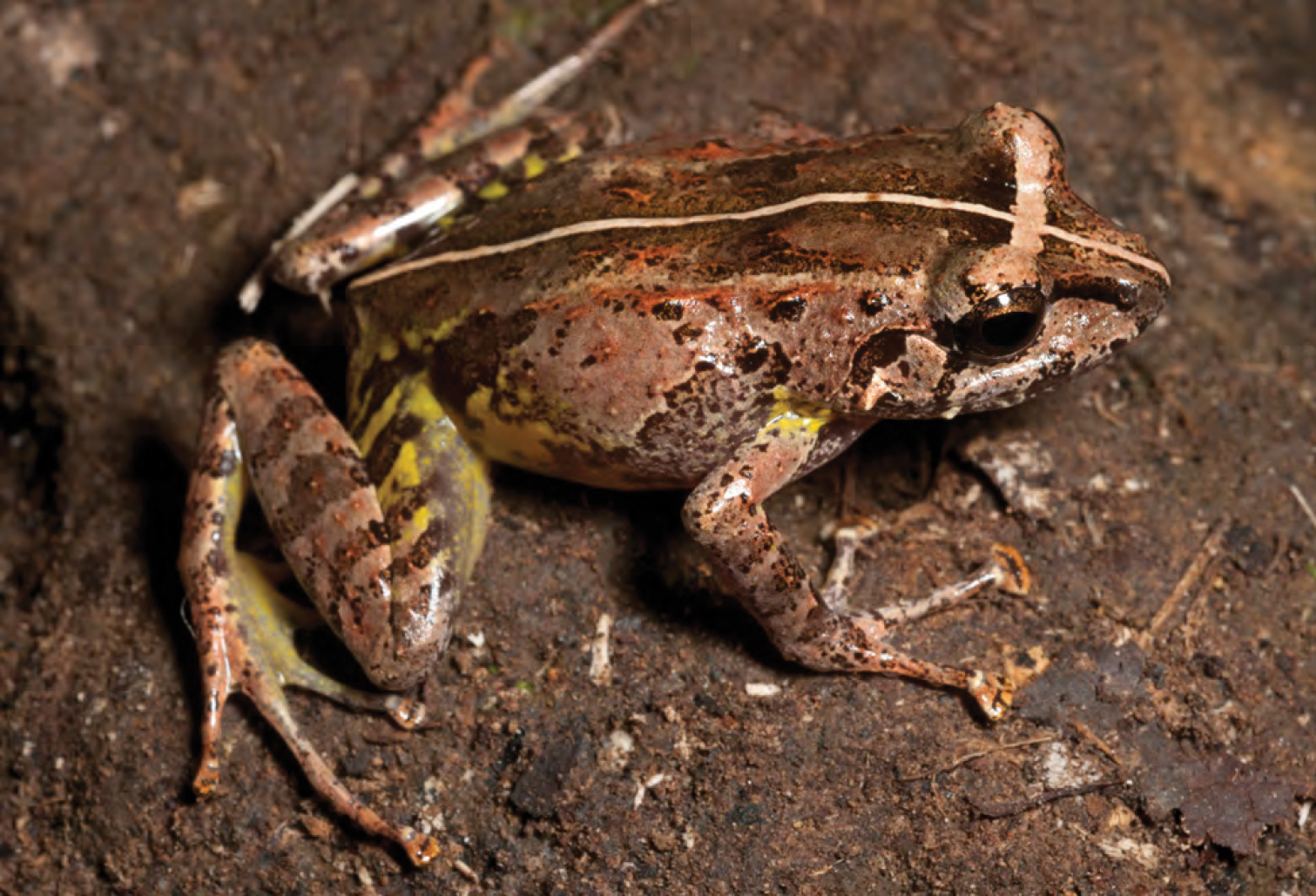

Conservation status
- Least Concern (IUCN 3.1)

Scientific classification
- Kingdom: Animalia
- Phylum: Chordata
- Class: Amphibia
- Order: Anura
- Family: Ceratobatrachidae
- Genus: Platymantis
- Species: P. cornutus

Binomial name
- Platymantis cornutus (Taylor, 1922)

Synonyms
- Platymantis cornuta (unjustified emendation)

= Horned forest frog =

Species of amphibian

The horned forest frog or horned wrinkled ground frog (Platymantis cornutus) is a species of frog in the family Ceratobatrachidae. It is endemic to the Philippines, where it is found in the Central Cordilleras of northern Luzon. It has been observed between 500 and 900 meters above sea level.

Its natural habitats are tropical moist lowland forest, tropical moist montane forest, plantations, rural gardens, and heavily degraded former forest. It is threatened by habitat loss.
