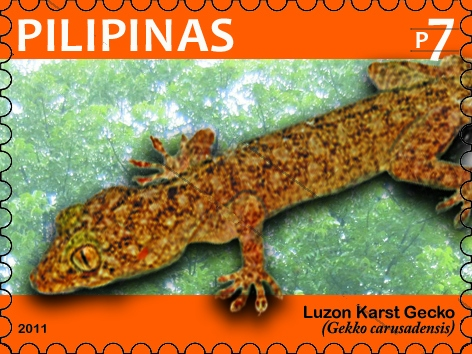

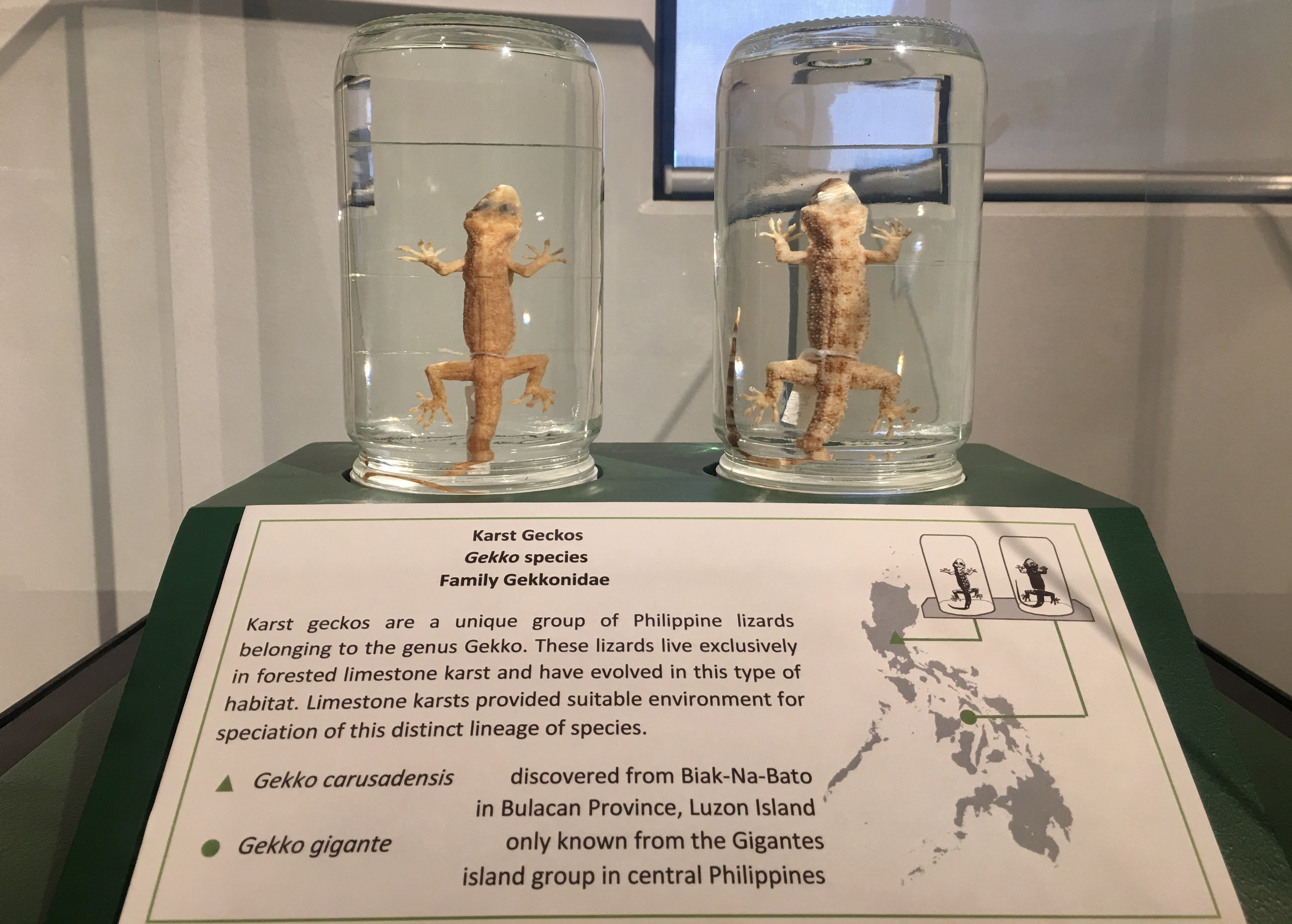
- Preserved bodies of Luzon Karst Geckos at Philippine National Museum

Scientific classification
- Kingdom: Animalia
- Phylum: Chordata
- Class: Reptilia
- Order: Squamata
- Suborder: Gekkota
- Family: Gekkonidae
- Genus: Gekko
- Species: G. carusadensis

Binomial name
- Gekko carusadensis Linkem, Siler, Diesmos, Sy & Brown, 2010

= Luzon karst gecko =

Species of lizard

The Luzon karst gecko (Gekko carusadensis) is a species of gecko endemic to the Philippines. It was described in 2010 using samples collected in 2009 on the Luzon island. Its length is ca. 8.3–10.0 cm for males and 8.0–8.8 cm for females. Its name carusadensis refers to Carusadus, a region in Slovenia rich in karst topography, which is favored by this species.
