= Panay forest frog =

Conservation status
- Endangered (IUCN 3.1)

Scientific classification
- Kingdom: Animalia
- Phylum: Chordata
- Class: Amphibia
- Order: Anura
- Family: Ceratobatrachidae
- Genus: Platymantis
- Species: P. panayensis

Binomial name
- Platymantis panayensis Brown, Brown & Alcala, 1996

Species of amphibian

The Panay forest frog (Platymantis panayensis) is a species of frog in the family Ceratobatrachidae. It is endemic to western Panay, Philippines. It has been observed between 400 and 1750 meters above sea level in cloud forests on Panay Island.

Its natural habitats are subtropical or tropical moist lowland forest and subtropical or tropical moist montane forest. It is threatened by habitat loss.
