= Platymantis paengi =

Conservation status
- Endangered (IUCN 3.1)

Scientific classification
- Kingdom: Animalia
- Phylum: Chordata
- Class: Amphibia
- Order: Anura
- Family: Ceratobatrachidae
- Genus: Platymantis
- Species: P. paengi

Binomial name
- Platymantis paengi Siler, Linkem, Diesmos & Alcala, 2007

Species of frog

Platymantis paengi, the Panay limestone frog, is a species of frog in the family Ceratobatrachidae. It is endemic to the Philippines. It is only known from Mount Lihidan, a limestone karst mountain of Pandan, Antique Province, Panay Island. This frog has been observed between 180 and 300 meters above sea level.

The adult male frog measures about 27.7–34.3 mm in snout-vent length.
