= Cornufer magnus =

Conservation status
- Least Concern (IUCN 3.1)

Scientific classification
- Kingdom: Animalia
- Phylum: Chordata
- Class: Amphibia
- Order: Anura
- Family: Ceratobatrachidae
- Genus: Cornufer
- Species: C. magnus

Binomial name
- Cornufer magnus (Brown & Menzies, 1979)

Synonyms
- Platymantis magna

Species of frog

Cornufer magnus is a species of frog in the family Ceratobatrachidae. It is endemic to Papua New Guinea. It lives as high above sea level as 1175 meters above sea level.

Its natural habitats are subtropical or tropical moist lowland forests, subtropical or tropical moist montane forests, rivers, caves, plantations, rural gardens, and heavily degraded former forest. It is threatened by habitat loss.
