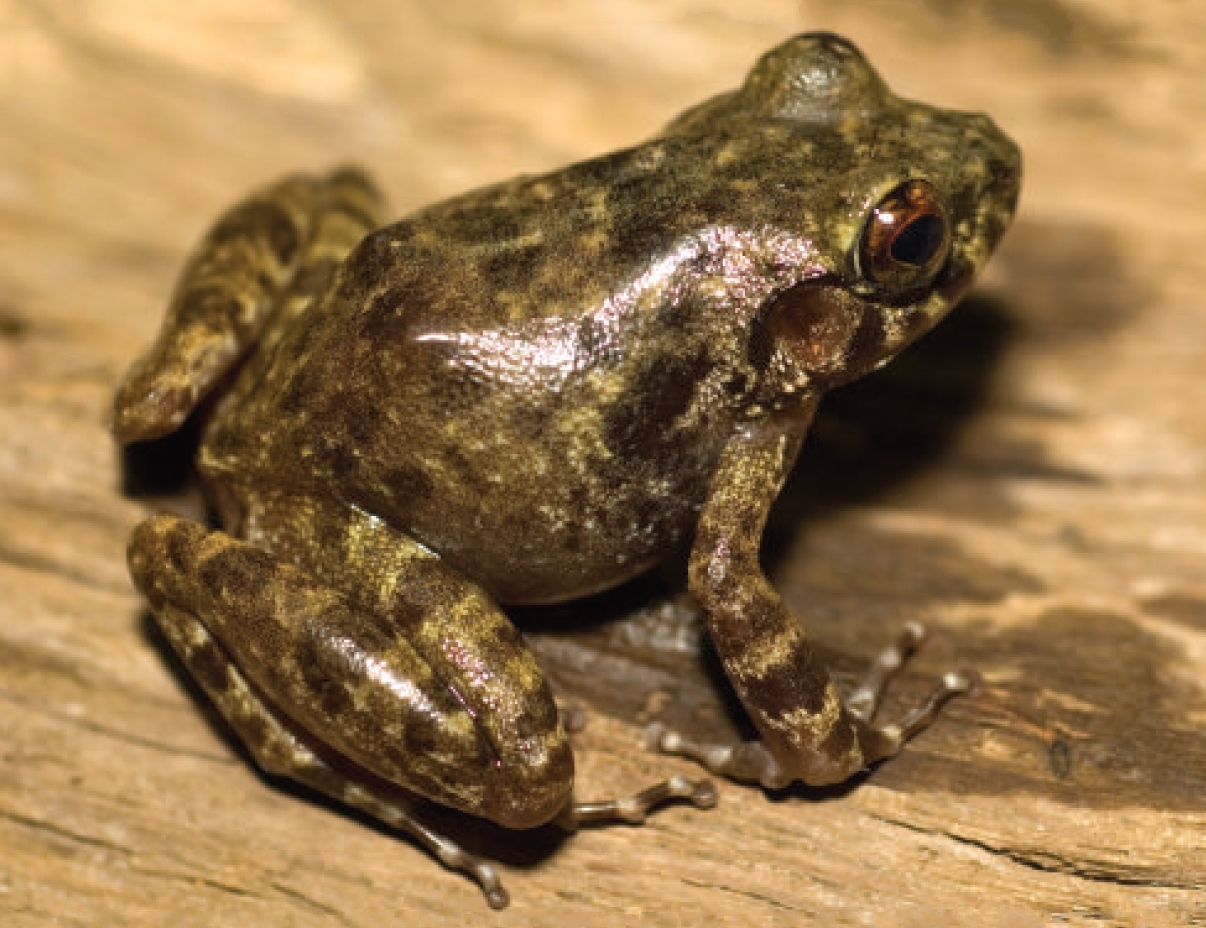

Conservation status
- Near Threatened (IUCN 3.1)

Scientific classification
- Kingdom: Animalia
- Phylum: Chordata
- Class: Amphibia
- Order: Anura
- Family: Ceratobatrachidae
- Genus: Platymantis
- Species: P. biak

Binomial name
- Platymantis biak Siler, Diesmos, Linkem, Diesmos, and Brown, 2010

= Platymantis biak =

Species of amphibian

Platymantis biak, also known as the Luzon limestone forest frog, is a species of frog in the family Ceratobatrachidae. It is endemic to the island of Luzon, the Philippines, where it is known from the Biak-na-Bato National Park, its type locality, and from the immediate vicinity of the park. The specific name biak is Tagalog meaning "crevice" or "crack" and refers to the preferred limestone karst habitat at the type locality.

== Description ==
Adult males measure 32–40 mm (1.3–1.6 in) and adult females 37–42 mm (1.5–1.7 in) in snout–vent length. The overall appearance is robust. The head is broader than the body. The tympanum is distinct. The supratympanic fold is smooth. The finger and the toe discs are moderately expanded, larger in the former than in the latter. The dorsum and head are mottled light green, dark green, and black. There is a distinct, black interorbital bar that is anteriorly bordered by lighter, green-brown border. The lower surfaces of the supratympanic fold are black, and there are black canthal and labial blotches by the eye. The dorsum has several large, irregularly distributed black blotches. The dorsal surfaces of the limbs have alternating dark brown and green transverse bars. There is an area of black blotches and cream speckles on anterior portion of flanks. The pupil is bordered by copper ciliary ring of iris, sharply blending into predominant mottled gold and brown color pattern of the iris.

Especially female Platymantis biak are well camouflaged in their limestone habitat.

== Habitat and conservation ==
These frogs have been found perched on top of limestone rocks within large rock formations in the forest and around the entrances to cave systems; males have also been observed up to 5 m inside caves, some perched above ground within depressions and holes in the karst rock walls. They occur at about 190 m (620 ft) above sea level. Development is probably direct (i.e., there is no free-living larval stage).

This species can be common to abundant in suitable habitat, but its known range is small. There is limestone quarrying and mining in the region in which the species occurs, although this activity is not threatening the known locations, most of which are within the Biak-na-Bato National Park.
