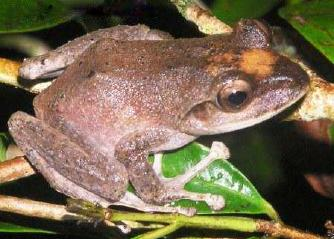

Conservation status
- Near Threatened (IUCN 3.1)

Scientific classification
- Kingdom: Animalia
- Phylum: Chordata
- Class: Amphibia
- Order: Anura
- Family: Ceratobatrachidae
- Genus: Platymantis
- Species: P. vitiensis

Binomial name
- Platymantis vitiensis (Girard, 1853)

= Platymantis vitiensis =

Species of amphibian

Platymantis vitiensis (common names: Fiji tree frog, Levuka wrinkled ground frog) is a species of frog in the family Ceratobatrachidae. It is one of two endemic frogs in Fiji, the other being the related Cornufer vitianus (Viti Wrinkled ground frog or Fiji ground frog).

== Description ==
The adult male frog measures about 32–45 mm in snout-vent length and the adult female frog about 47–60 mm. The climbing disks on the front toes are much larger than the ones on the hind toes. The skin of the dorsum can be gray, orange, yellow, or gray-green, but is never green. Some individuals have a white or yellow stripe on their backs.

== Behavior and reproduction ==
This frog is an able swimmer and jumper. It has been observe twisting in mid-air so that it may make an immediate subsequent jump in a different direction to confound predators. Unlike most frog species, the female and male both sing. However, because the female lacks a vocal sac, her call sounds different from her male counterpart's.

The female frog lays 20–40 eggs per clutch. She lays her eggs on plants. This frog undergoes direct development, hatching as a small froglet rather than as a free-swimming tadpole.

== Habitat and distribution ==
Platymantis vitiensis is a locally common species that lives in moist tropical lowland forest, in particular near streams. It can also be found in lesser numbers in gardens, plantations, and in pandans in pastureland. It is found on Ovalau, Taveuni, Vanua Levu and Viti Levu. It is threatened by habitat loss on these islands, particularly due to the increase in conversion of native forest to plantations.
