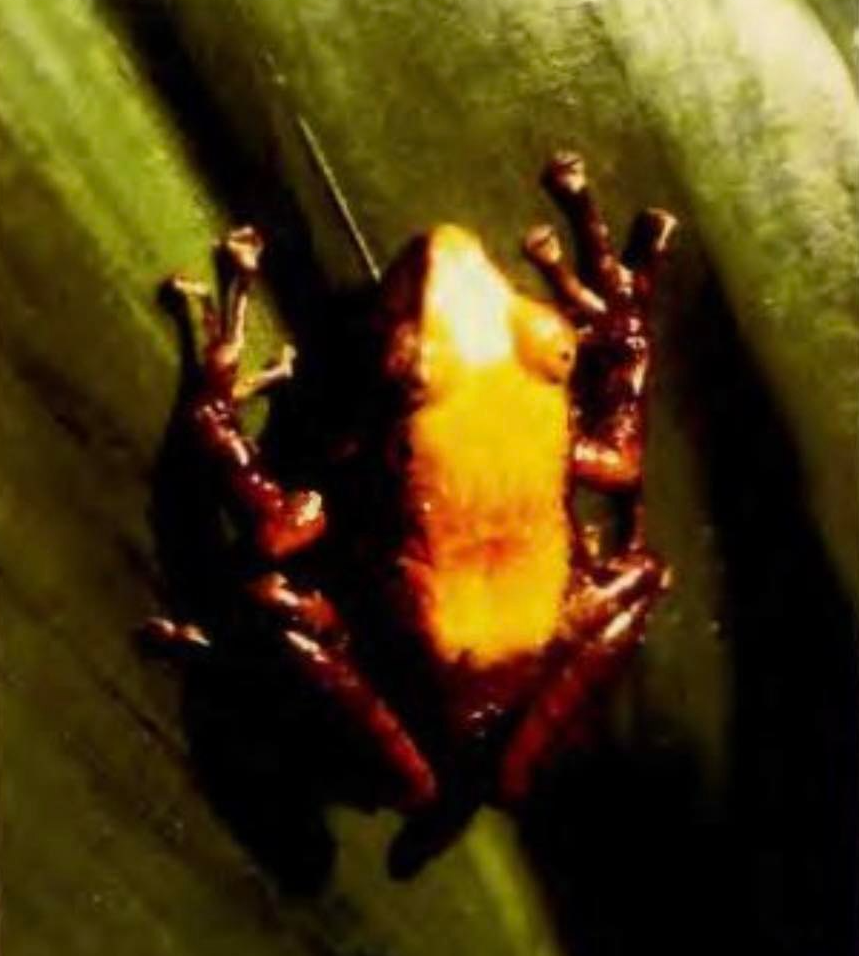

Conservation status
- Near Threatened (IUCN 3.1)

Scientific classification
- Kingdom: Animalia
- Phylum: Chordata
- Class: Amphibia
- Order: Anura
- Family: Ceratobatrachidae
- Genus: Platymantis
- Species: P. banahao

Binomial name
- Platymantis banahao Brown, Alcala, Diesmos & Alcala, 1997

= Banahao forest frog =

Species of amphibian

The Banahao forest frog (Platymantis banahao) is a species of frog in the family Ceratobatrachidae. It is endemic to Luzon, Philippines, where it is only known from Mount Banahaw (Banahaw and San Cristobal peaks). Scientists have seen it between 700 and 1700 meters above sea level.

Its natural habitats are subtropical or tropical moist lowland forest and subtropical or tropical moist montane forest. It is threatened by habitat loss.
