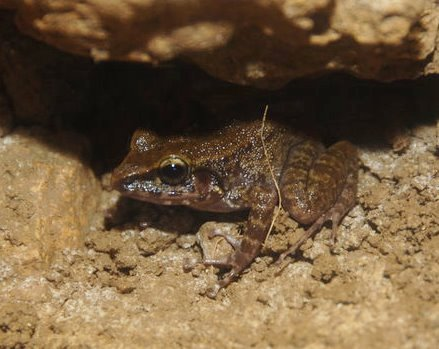

Conservation status
- Critically Endangered (IUCN 3.1)

Scientific classification
- Kingdom: Animalia
- Phylum: Chordata
- Class: Amphibia
- Order: Anura
- Family: Ceratobatrachidae
- Genus: Platymantis
- Species: P. insulatus

Binomial name
- Platymantis insulatus Brown and Alcala, 1970

Synonyms
- Platymantis insulata (unjustified emendation)

= Platymantis insulatus =

Species of amphibian

Platymantis insulatus is a species of frog in the family Ceratobatrachidae. It is endemic to the Gigante Islands just northeast of Panay, the Philippines. This frog is variously known as the Gigantes wrinkled ground frog, island forest frog, South Gigante Island frog, Gigantes forest frog, and Gigantes limestone frog. Originally described from South Gigante, it is now known to occur on at least three other islands.

== Description ==
Adult males measure 38–42 mm (1.5–1.7 in) and adult females 40–46 mm (1.6–1.8 in) in snout–vent length. The overall appearance is relatively slender. The head is relatively narrow and the snout is rounded-pointed. The tympanum is relatively large, and a supratympanic fold is present. The fingers relatively long and narrow and bear discs but no webbing. The toes are slender with basal webbing and terminal discs. Preserved individuals are dorsally grayish olive green to live-brown; the lighter-shaded specimens are heavily mottled with large, irregular, brownish or dark blotches. The hind limbs have rather narrow, irregular, dark cross bands.

== Habitat and conservation ==
Platymantis insulatus inhabits limestone karst forest and caves in forested lowlands less than 600 m (2,000 ft) above sea level. These frogs are frequently recorded from the most moist and coolest parts of caves, but it appears that both adults and juveniles venture out into the forest for feeding. Development is direct (i.e., there is no free-living larval stage), with individual fecundity up to 48 eggs.

Platymantis insulatus is common on all four islands it inhabits, and it is abundant when the weather is appropriate (during heavy rains). However, the islands are experiencing habitat loss and deterioration. In particular, guano mining and the quarrying of limestone are likely to harm the habitat of this species, and the populations are believed to be declining. This species does not occur in any protected areas, but there are efforts towards better environmental protection in the area. As of late 2019, establishment of a captive colony was on the way.
