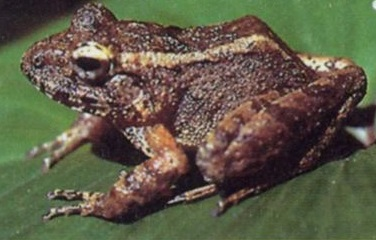

Conservation status
- Least Concern (IUCN 3.1)

Scientific classification
- Kingdom: Animalia
- Phylum: Chordata
- Class: Amphibia
- Order: Anura
- Family: Ceratobatrachidae
- Genus: Platymantis
- Species: P. dorsalis

Binomial name
- Platymantis dorsalis (A.H.A. Duméril, 1853)

Synonyms
- Cornufer laticeps Taylor, 1920 Halophila jagorii Peters, 1863 Platymantis meyeri Günther, 1873

= Platymantis dorsalis =

Species of frog

Platymantis dorsalis (Dumeril's wrinkled ground frog or common forest frog) is a species of frog in the family Ceratobatrachidae. It is endemic to the northern and central Philippines. Its natural habitats are subtropical or tropical moist lowland forests, subtropical or tropical moist montane forests, plantations, rural gardens, and heavily degraded former forests. It is threatened by habitat loss.

== Range ==
Platymantis dorsalis is known from mainland Luzon, Batan Island, Polillo, Catanduanes, Tablas, Romblon, Marinduque, Cebu, Negros, and Panay islands.
