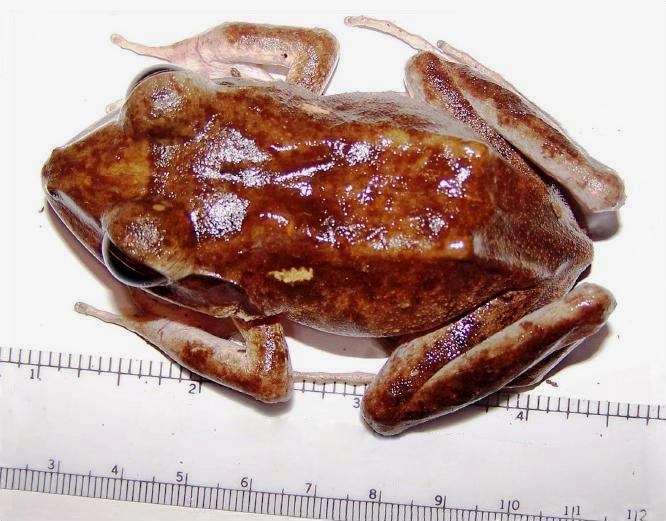

Conservation status
- Near Threatened (IUCN 3.1)

Scientific classification
- Kingdom: Animalia
- Phylum: Chordata
- Class: Amphibia
- Order: Anura
- Family: Ceratobatrachidae
- Genus: Cornufer
- Species: C. vitianus

Binomial name
- Cornufer vitianus (A.H.A. Duméril, 1853)

Synonyms
- Platymantis vitianus (Dumeril, 1853)

= Cornufer vitianus =

Species of amphibian

Cornufer vitianus, commonly known as Fiji ground frog or Viti wrinkled ground frog, is a species of frog in the family Ceratobatrachidae. It is endemic to Fiji.

Presumed to be originally a forest species, it is nowadays also found in a range of man-made habitats, including degraded forest, rural gardens, plantations, and even close to the beach.

The Fiji ground frog is found on four larger islands (Taveuni, Vanua Levu, Ovalau, and Gau) and a small island, Viwa, (0.6 ha) off the eastern coast of the main island (Viti Levu) of the Fiji archipelago. The species maintains populations throughout the forested (primary, secondary and coastal/littoral) parts of these islands (Osborne, unpublished data).

A largish frog, it can grow up to 100 g and to body lengths (SUL) of 110 mm. The larger individuals tend to be a very dull dark brown (sometimes with yellow spots on either side of the head near the tympanum). However, smaller adults and juvenile frogs can be highly polymorphic in coloration, with banding and stippling in darker or lighter hues of red, brown, green and curry-yellow. It is distinguished from the Cornufer vitiensis by its larger size and smaller toe pads.

The Fiji ground is a nocturnal ground dweller, however, individuals have been encountered on low branches and leaves of riparian forest vegetation. It is thought to be a sit and wait predator, waiting for nocturnal insects to venture nearby.

== Reproduction ==
The breeding cycle of these frogs is affected by extrinsic environmental conditions and intrinsic reproductive hormonal mechanisms. During the active breeding phase mature gravid females clearly show the presence of large creamy eggs. Nesting occurs terrestrially, mostly underneath rotting logs, and crevices within coconut tree bark and within bamboo. This species lays around 50-60 eggs inside prepared nests and covered with leaf litter. Embryonic development takes place over 29–30 days and froglets hatch directly from eggs forgoing the tadpole stage. The age at maturity of C. vitianus is still not known.
