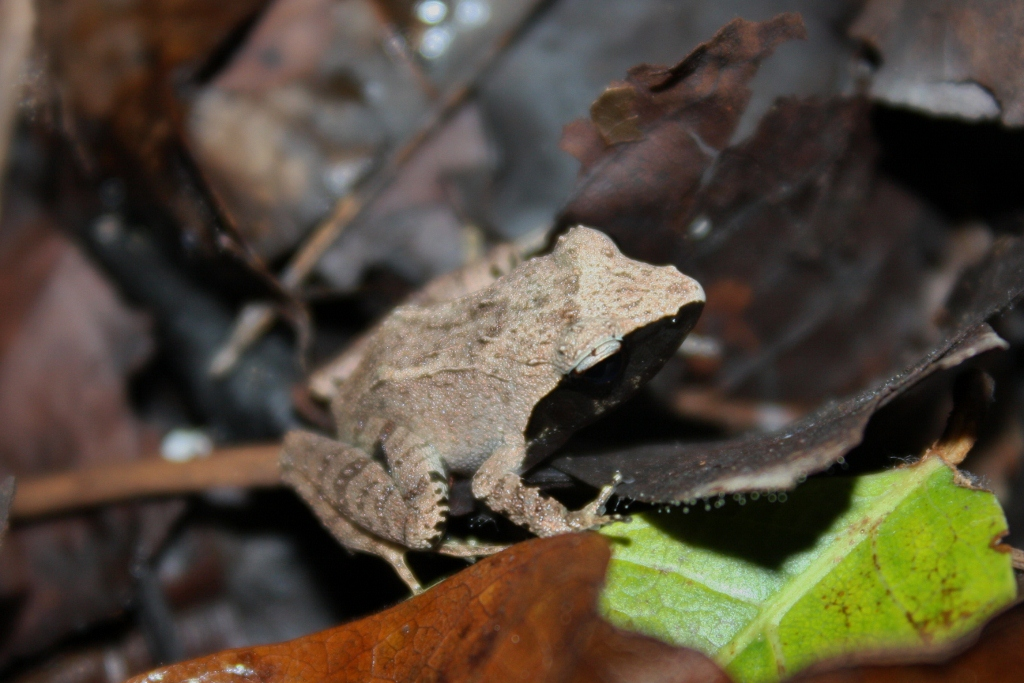

Conservation status
- Least Concern (IUCN 3.1)

Scientific classification
- Kingdom: Animalia
- Phylum: Chordata
- Class: Amphibia
- Order: Anura
- Family: Ceratobatrachidae
- Genus: Platymantis
- Species: P. corrugatus

Binomial name
- Platymantis corrugatus (Duméril, 1853)

Synonyms
- Platymantis corrugata (unjustified emendation); Platymantis plicifera Günther, 1858

= Platymantis corrugatus =

Species of amphibian

Platymantis corrugatus (Philippine wrinkled ground frog or rough-back forest frog) is a species of frog in the family Ceratobatrachidae. It is endemic to the Philippines, where it is found throughout the archipelago except Palawan. Its natural habitats are tropical moist lowland forest and subtropical or tropical moist montane forest. It is threatened by habitat loss. Platymantis corrugatus is one of the most common Platymantis species in the Philippines.

== Range ==
Platymantis corrugatus is known from Luzon, Mindoro, Leyte, Samar, Siquijor, Bohol, Cebu, Negros, Panay, and Mindanao islands.
