= Malinao Volcano =

Stratovolcano in the Bicol Region of the Philippines

Mount Malinao
- Mount Malinao
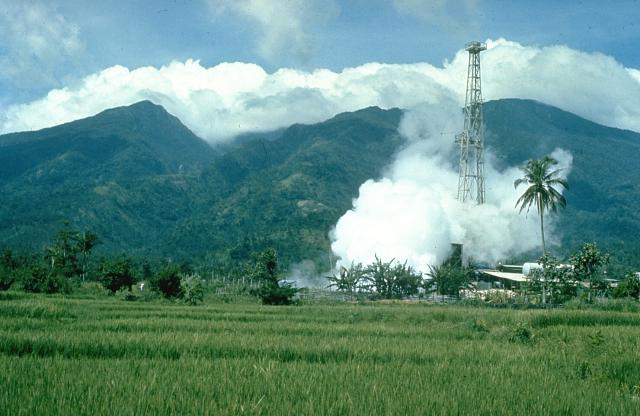
- Mount Malinao with Tiwi Geothermal Field in the foreground

Highest point
- Elevation: 1,657 m (5,436 ft)
- Prominence: 1,368 m (4,488 ft)
- Listing: Potentially active volcano Ribu
- Coordinates: 13°24′58″N 123°36′30″E

Geography
- Location within Albay Location within Luzon Location within Philippines
- Country: Philippines
- Region: Bicol Region
- Provinces: Albay; Camarines Sur
- City/municipality: Buhi; Malinao; Tiwi

Geology
- Rock age: 500,000-600,000 years
- Mountain type: stratovolcano
- Volcanic zone: Bicol Volcanic Chain
- Last eruption: 1980

Mount Malinao is a potentially active stratovolcano located in the Bicol Region of the Philippines. The volcano displays strong fumarolic activity which is harnessed for generating electricity. Located on its slope is Tiwi Geothermal Power Plant, one of the first geothermal energy plant commissioned in the country.

== Location ==
Malinao Volcano is situated between the provinces of Albay and Camarines Sur in the southeastern region of Luzon Island; about 20 km (12 mi) north-northwest of Mayon volcano, the most active volcano in the Philippines.

== Physical features ==
The mountain is forested with an elevation of 1,657 metres (5,436 ft) above sea level and a base diameter of 22.5 kilometres (14.0 mi). On the summit of the volcano is a large crater with bare inner walls that are breached on the eastern side. On the lower flank this side of the predominantly andesitic volcano, is Luzon's largest solfataras and hot springs, some of which deposit siliceous sinter. Naglagbong and Jigabo are two thermal wells located on the volcano. Temperatures up to 108 °C (226 °F) were recorded on the fumaroles of Naglagbong.

=== Tiwi Geothermal Power Plant ===
This area was one of the first studied for generating electricity starting with a 250 kW power plant in 1967. In 1979, the first of the three 110 MW geothermal power plant was commissioned that year; the other two, in 1980 and 1982. At its peak, the plant was producing a maximum of 330 MW output. Recently, the 1979 plant was decommissioned due to decrease in steam supply.

== Classification ==
The Philippine Institute of Volcanology and Seismology (PHIVOLCS), the government bureau that deals with volcanism in the country classifies Malinao as a potentially active volcano.

== Eruptions & activities ==
There are no historical eruptions from Malinao which is believed to have been active from about 500,000 years ago until 60,000 years ago.

=== 1970 earthquake swarms ===
There was an increase in seismicity in 1970 accompanied by rumbling noises in Malinao prompting an issue of warning that the mountain might be reactivating. The tremors detected were ranging from 1 to 5 in intensity.

=== Small explosion in 1980 ===
There was a minor phreatic explosion in the Naglagbong pool area in Tiwi on July 29, 1980, ejecting mud and rocks up to 2/3 metre (2 ft 2 in), reaching 150 metres (490 ft) in height and distances up to 350 metres (1,150 ft). One person was injured and two buildings were damaged by the explosion. Prior to the event, as early as July 6, the area was experiencing unusual microseisms recorded at seismic station of the Commission on Volcanology (COMVOL) - the predecessor of PHIVOLCS - in the area. Geysering was also observed on the pool, two hours before the explosion. One theory about the cause of the explosion was water drawdown during the development of the Tiwi geothermal field.

== Mythology ==
The volcano is believed to be the home of the ancient Bicolano god of beasts, Asuang, who challenged the supreme god of the Bicolano, Gugurang. He is worshiped alongside his friend, Bulan, the boy-god of the moon.

== See also ==
- List of active volcanoes in the Philippines
- List of potentially active volcanoes in the Philippines
- List of inactive volcanoes in the Philippines
- Pacific ring of fire
