= Angel Alcala =

Filipino biologist (1929–2023)

Angel Alcala ONS
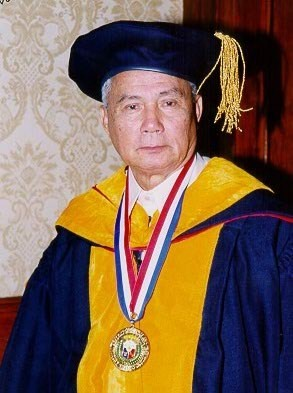
- Official portrait, National Academy of Science and Technology

Chairperson of the Commission on Higher Education
- In office July 1, 1998 – 1999
- President: Joseph Estrada
- Succeeded by: Ester Garcia
- In office July 1, 1995 – June 30, 1998
- President: Fidel V. Ramos
- Preceded by: Ricardo Gloria

23rd Secretary of Environment and Natural Resources
- In office September 8, 1992 – June 30, 1995
- President: Fidel V. Ramos
- Preceded by: Ricardo Umali (acting)
- Succeeded by: Victor O. Ramos

9th President of Silliman University
- In office 1991–1992
- Preceded by: Pedro V. Flores
- Succeeded by: Mervyn J. Misajon

Personal details
- Born: March 1, 1929 Cauayan, Negros Occidental, Philippines
- Died: February 1, 2023 (aged 93) Dumaguete, Negros Oriental, Philippines
- Education: Silliman University (B.S., 1951); Stanford University (M.S., 1960); Xavier University (Ph.D., 1966)
- Profession: Marine biologist
- Awards: Order of National Scientists of the Philippines (2014)

Angel Chua Alcala ONS (March 1, 1929 – February 1, 2023) was a Filipino biologist who was named a National Scientist of the Philippines in 2014. Alcala is known for his fieldwork to build sanctuaries and to promote biodiversity in the aquatic ecosystems of the Philippines. He was the Chairman of the Board of Advisers at the Angelo King Center for Research and Environmental Management located in Silliman University. Alcala published more than 200 peer-reviewed articles and books and his biological contributions to the environment and ecosystems have made him a renowned figure of natural sciences in the Philippines.

== Early life ==
Alcala was born on March 1, 1929, in the municipality of Cauayan, Negros Occidental. He was raised by a moderately low-income family in the small coastal town of Caliling, Philippines. Alcala worked alongside his father who worked as a fisherman at the nearby agricultural fish ponds. Due to his family's financial struggles, they depended on the ocean for its resources either in providing food or items to sell.

== Education ==
In 1951, Angel Alcala earned his bachelor's degree in biology (magna cum laude) from Silliman University. He then declined acceptance to the University of the Philippines College of Medicine in order to assist his family. During that time, he occasionally assisted in biological fieldwork, for example for Sidney Dillon Ripley and Dioscoro Rabor in 1953 when they collected the only known (as of 2019) specimen of the Negros fruit dove. Alcala later attended Stanford University to complete his master's degree after 9 years. By 1966, he earned his Ph.D. in the same field and an honor doctorate from both the Xavier University and the University of Southeastern Philippines. Alcala later became a professor at Silliman University, where he also served as president for two consecutive years. He served as secretary of the Department of Environment and Natural Resources from 1992 to 1995 and chairman of the Commission on Higher Education (CHEd) from 1995 to 1999. He also served as consultant on marine and aquatic projects under the United Nations Environment Programme, World Bank, Asian Development Bank, World Bank Global Environment Facility, the Pew Fellowship in Marine Conservation, and the University of the Philippines Marine Science Institute.

== Research ==
=== Environmental management ===
Angel Alcala is accredited with many research accomplishments and improvements regarding environmental management, marine conservation, and discovery of new species. One of Alcala's works consisted of restoring or preserving areas with predominant wild, large predatory fish populations near a small marine sanctuary at Apo Island in the Philippines. His goal was to sustain hospitable conditions in this sanctuary throughout the duration of his research. This sanctuary, called the Sumilon Marine Reserve, began as just an uninhabited area under 100 kilometers away from Apo Island. Another research element Alcala incorporated in his study is associating the species’ survival rate of large, predatory fish with available ocean territories around reefs and fisheries. This helped place an effort to set boundaries to distinguish marine sanctuaries and fishing areas. Alcala's conservation efforts accompanied by his research in oceanic and land management helped stabilize retention of once-endangered species in the Sumilon Island and Apo Island marine reserves.

His studies correlated the efforts of protective environmental practices with the effects of either continuing or ceasing those regulations. Incidents of fishing are common consequences when ocean space and resources are available and not properly managed. These studies were primarily conducted near coral reefs of Sumilon Island located in the central Philippines. Alcala concluded how maximizing conservation and environmental efforts near these coral reefs reduced fishing and stabilized struggling fish species that faced the increased loss of habitat.

=== Marine conservation ===
Angel Alcala experimented with his teams to conserve coral reefs and other marine resources. In their "no-take" experiment, Alcala's team tested the mobility of fish species when humans were forbidden from fishing in these areas. By doing so, they discovered that the species abundance in the area declined while pushing the boundaries of their residence to further reaches. These findings provide evidence that conservation of these fishes and coral reefs not only slows the species' decline in numbers, but also the growth in habitat for all marine life.

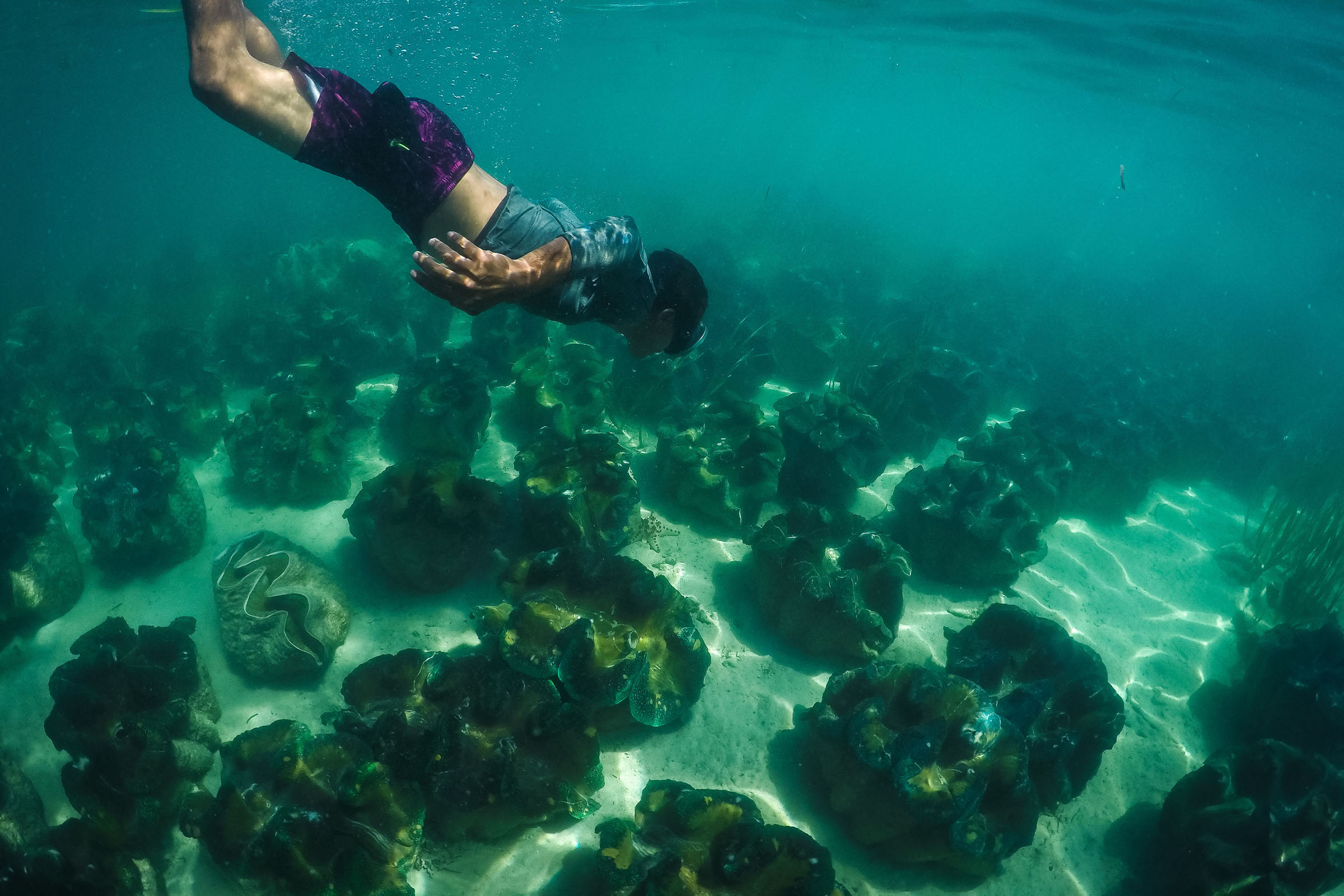
Bolinao Giant Clam Sanctuary

Alcala has also worked to protect the lives of giant clams in the Philippines. He worked alongside Dr. Edgardo Gomez to assess the organisms' status in 1983. After thorough evaluation of Bolinao waters, they learned that the numbers were insufficient. Gomez and Alcala retrieved young giant clams from the Solomon Islands to breed back in Bolinao. After their work, the giant clam population has increased significantly to ensure that the ecosystem is stable. On October 25, 2014, he visited the Semirara coast where he spoke in favor of saving giant clams.

=== Species discoveries ===
Along with his many other accomplishments, Angel Alcala's work has led to the discovery of 50 new species of reptiles and amphibians. In other words, more than 10 percent of all reptiles and amphibians in the Philippines are known today because of Alcala's work. This fieldwork began while he was still a student and ultimately built a stronger foundation to jumpstart conservation programs within the Philippines.

== Awards and other accomplishments ==
In 1959, Angel Alcala earned the Fulbright-Smith Mundt master's fellowship in Stanford University's biology department.

In 1963, Alcala was awarded the Guggenheim Fellowship for Natural Sciences in the category for Organismal Biology & Ecology.

In 1992, the Ramon Magsaysay Award Foundation awarded Alcala the Ramon Magsaysay Award and acknowledged him for pioneering scientific leadership in restoring and conserving the coral reefs of the Philippines.

In 1994, he received the Field Museum Founders' Council Award of Merit for his contributions to environmental biology.

In 1999, he was awarded the Pew Fellowship in Marine Conservation for his continued, exceptional work in marine conservation.

In 2014, President Benigno Simeon Aquino III Proclamation No. 782, naming Alcala a National Scientist of the Philippines in recognition of his research on ecology and diversity of Philippine amphibians and reptiles, marine biodiversity, and marine-protected areas.

In 2017, Alcala was named an ASEAN Biodiversity Hero. He was also previously the Department of Environment and Natural Resources (DENR) Secretary in the Philippines.

In 2018, he was named a member of the Fulbright Philippines Hall of Fame.

In November 2018, he was awarded Oceans Legend by PEMSEA during the East Asian Seas (EAS) Congress in Iloilo City.

In 2022, he was added to the Asian Scientist 100 by Asian Scientist.

Two species of Philippine snakes are named in his honor: Lycodon alcalai and Opisthotropis alcalai.

One species of nudibranch is named in his honor: Chromodoris alcalai.

== Private life and death ==
Alcala was married to Naomi and they had 6 children.

Alcala died on February 1, 2023, at the age of 93.
