= Golden skink =

Golden skink is a vernacular name for some smallish skink species from tropical Asia:

- Eutropis carinata (Keeled Indian Mabuya)
- Eutropis multifasciata (East Indian Brown Mabuya)
