= Lapu-Lapu (disambiguation) =

Lapulapu or Lapu-Lapu was a datu of Mactan (fl. 1521).

Lapu-Lapu may also refer to:

== Animal species ==
- Epinephelus undulosus, a fish known in the Philippines known as Lapu-lapu
- Eutropis lapulapu, a species of skink

== Other uses ==
- Lapu-Lapu (film), a 2002 Filipino film
- Lapu-Lapu City, a highly-urbanized city in Cebu, Philippines
- Lapu-Lapu Day, a public holiday in the Philippines, celebrated also by Filipinos in British Columbia, Canada

== See also ==
- Rapu-Rapu, a municipality in Albay, Philippines
