= Bibron's skink =

There are two species of skink named Bibron's skink:

- Chioninia coctei, a reptile known to have inhabited islets in the Cape Verde islands
- Eutropis bibronii, a lizard endemic to India and Sri Lanka
