= Two-striped mabuya =

Two-striped mabuya may refer to either of two small skink species formerly placed in the genus Mabuya:

- Eutropis multicarinata from Asia, otherwise known as Many-keeled Mabuya
- Varzea bistriata from the Americas
