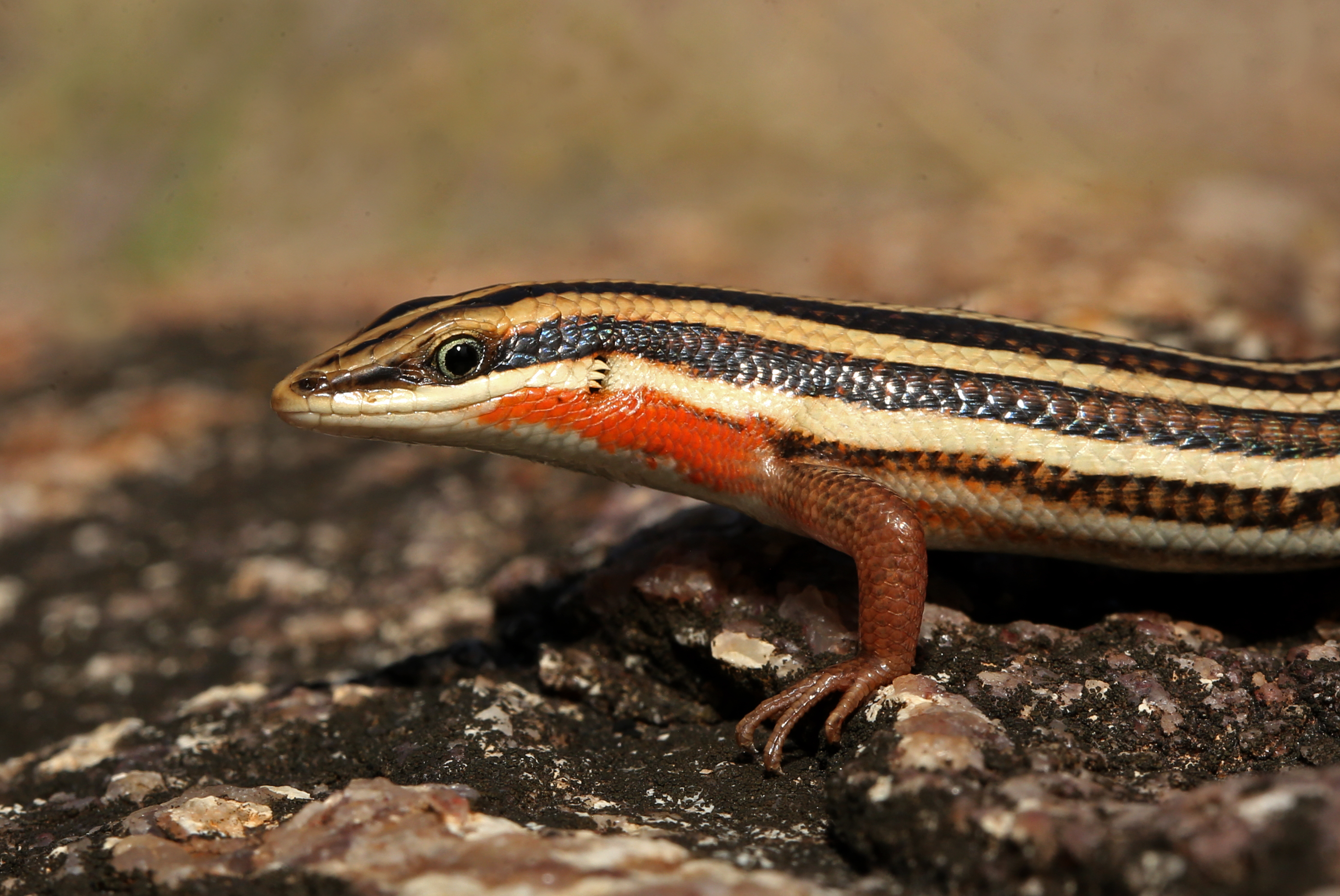
- Eutropis nagarjuni

Conservation status
- Near Threatened (IUCN 3.1)

Scientific classification
- Kingdom: Animalia
- Phylum: Chordata
- Class: Reptilia
- Order: Squamata
- Suborder: Scinciformata
- Infraorder: Scincomorpha
- Family: Mabuyidae
- Genus: Eutropis
- Species: E. nagarjuni

Binomial name
- Eutropis nagarjuni (Sharma, 1969)

Synonyms
- Mabuya nagarjuni; Eutropis nagarjuni

= Sharma's mabuya =

Species of lizards

Sharma's mabuya (Eutropis nagarjuni) is a species of skinks found in India. It was described by Sharma (1969) from hills south of Vijaypuri on the right bank of the river Krishna in Andhra Pradesh.

== Description ==
This species can be distinguished from Eutropis beddomei by the supranasals which are separated by frontonasal (E. beddomei has supranasal in contact with each other), separate prefrontals (E. beddomei has prefrontals in contact with each other), three pairs of nuchals (E. beddomei has single pair), presence of post nasal (E. beddomei lacks it), dorsal scales with 5-7 keels (E. beddomei has 3-5 keels), 16-22 lamellae beneath the fourth toe (E. beddomei has 12-15 lamellae), and oval ear opening twice the size of the lateral scales (E. beddomei has circular ear opening almost the size of the lateral scales). (Srinivasulu et al. 2005)

Sharma (1969) described the colour as dark brown or black with white longitudinal stripes three on the back with the middle vertebral stripe. They become indistinct on the tail. The head scales have brown centres and light brown margins. the legs are dark brown above and the hind libs are sculpted with white above. The underside is white. Some specimens show an orangish-red stripe on either side of the neck that may be sex-specific trait.(Srinivasulu et al. 2005) The type specimen of the species was rediscovered in the collections of the Zoological Survey of India in 2007.(Srinivasulu & Das, 2007).

The species has been found from a few more localities in Nalgonda and Mahbubnagar districts of Andhra Pradesh.
