= E. innotata =

E. innotata may refer to:

- Epocilla innotata, Thorell, 1895, a spider species in the genus Epocilla found in Myanmar
- Eupithecia innotata innotata, the angle-barred pug, a moth species found in Europe
- Eutropis innotata, a skink species found in peninsular India

== See also ==
- Innotata
