= Eutropis borealis =

Conservation status
- Least Concern (IUCN 3.1)

Scientific classification
- Kingdom: Animalia
- Phylum: Chordata
- Class: Reptilia
- Order: Squamata
- Family: Scincidae
- Genus: Eutropis
- Species: E. borealis

Binomial name
- Eutropis borealis (Brown & Alcala, 1980)

Synonyms
- Mabuya multicarinata borealis Brown & Alcala, 1980

Species of lizard

Eutropis borealis is a species of skink. Before being elevated to full-species rank in 2020, it was considered a subspecies of Eutropis multicarinata (formerly Mabuya multicarinata).

Eutropis borealis is endemic to the Philippines and is known from the islands of Catanduanes, Luzon, Polillo, Babuyan Claro, and Batanes. Adults measure 64–83 mm (2.5–3.3 in) in snout–vent length.
