= Eutropis tammanna =

Tammanna skink

Conservation status
- Least Concern (IUCN 3.1)

Scientific classification
- Kingdom: Animalia
- Phylum: Chordata
- Class: Reptilia
- Order: Squamata
- Family: Scincidae
- Genus: Eutropis
- Species: E. tammanna

Binomial name
- Eutropis tammanna Das, de Silva, & Austin, 2008

Species of lizard

Eutropis tammanna is a species of skink endemic to the island of Sri Lanka.

== Habitat and distribution ==
It is a terrestrial skink found in open grasslands, coconut and cashew plantations, house gardens, and agricultural fields. It is widespread at elevations less than 200 m (660 ft).

== Description ==
The snout is short. It lacks transparent disks on the lower eyelids. Post-nasalia are absent. There are 15 lamellae under the fourth toe. Dorsal scales have 4–5 keels. The dorsum is medium brown, and the lips are bright orange in males and yellow in females, the color extending to the middle of the flanks. A black stripe extends from below the eye to beyond the base of tail, with large, creamy-yellow spots; in females, this stripe is paler. The venter is yellowish cream.

== Ecology and diet ==
It is a typically diurnal lizard, found under heaps of forest debris, leaves, logs, in shrubs and bushes, as well as near plantation and farm refuse, such as coconut husk piles. It lives generally at sea level, and close to beaches.

The diet typically consists of invertebrates that will fit into its mouth and that it can effectively swallow, including a variety of small cockroaches, beetles, beetle larvae (grubs), moths and their larvae, crickets, small grasshoppers, and earthworms, among other bugs and invertebrates. Larger specimens may potentially cannibalise juveniles, out of dominance, and may also be a threat to juvenile lizards belonging to other species. They may very seldomly prey upon tiny froglets and small or recently-born snakes, although insects and arthropods still make up the bulk of their diet.
