= Eutropis darevskii =

Conservation status
- Data Deficient (IUCN 3.1)

Scientific classification
- Kingdom: Animalia
- Phylum: Chordata
- Class: Reptilia
- Order: Squamata
- Family: Scincidae
- Genus: Eutropis
- Species: E. darevskii

Binomial name
- Eutropis darevskii (Bobrov, 1992)

Synonyms
- Mabuya darevskii Bobrov, 1992; Eutropis darevskii — Mausfeld et al., 2002

Species of lizard

Eutropis darevskii, also known commonly as Darevsy's mabouya, Darevsky's mabuya, and Darevsky's skink, is a species of lizard in the family Scincidae. The species is endemic to Vietnam.

== Etymology ==
The specific name, darevskii, is in honor of Russian herpetologist Ilya Darevsky.

== Geographic range ==
E. darevskii is found in Son La Province, Vietnam.

== Reproduction ==
The mode of reproduction of E. darevskii is unknown.
