= Eutropis alcalai =

Conservation status
- Data Deficient (IUCN 3.1)

Scientific classification
- Kingdom: Animalia
- Phylum: Chordata
- Class: Reptilia
- Order: Squamata
- Family: Scincidae
- Genus: Eutropis
- Species: E. alcalai

Binomial name
- Eutropis alcalai Barley, Sanguila & R.M. Brown, 2021

Species of lizard

Eutropis alcalai is a species of skink, a lizard in the family Scincidae. The species is endemic to the Philippines.

== Etymology ==
The specific name, alcalai, is in honor of Filipino herpetologist Angel Alcala.

== Geographic range ==
E. alcalai is found in western Mindanao, the Philippines.
