= Eutropis ashwamedhi =

Conservation status
- Endangered (IUCN 3.1)

Scientific classification
- Kingdom: Animalia
- Phylum: Chordata
- Class: Reptilia
- Order: Squamata
- Family: Scincidae
- Genus: Eutropis
- Species: E. ashwamedhi

Binomial name
- Eutropis ashwamedhi (Sharma, 1969)

Synonyms
- Riopa ashwamedhi Sharma, 1969; Lygosoma ashwamedhi — Das, 1996; Eutropis ashwamedhi — C. Srinivasulu et al., 2016

Species of lizard

Eutropis ashwamedhi, also known commonly as the Ashwamedh supple skink or Ashwamedha writhing skink, is a species of lizard in the family Scincidae. The species is endemic to India.

== Geographic range ==
E. ashwamedhi is found in the Indian state of Andhra Pradesh.

== Habitat ==
The preferred natural habitat of E. ashwamedhi is shrubland, at altitudes of 230–300 m (750–980 ft).

== Reproduction ==
The mode of reproduction of E. ashwamedhi is unknown.
