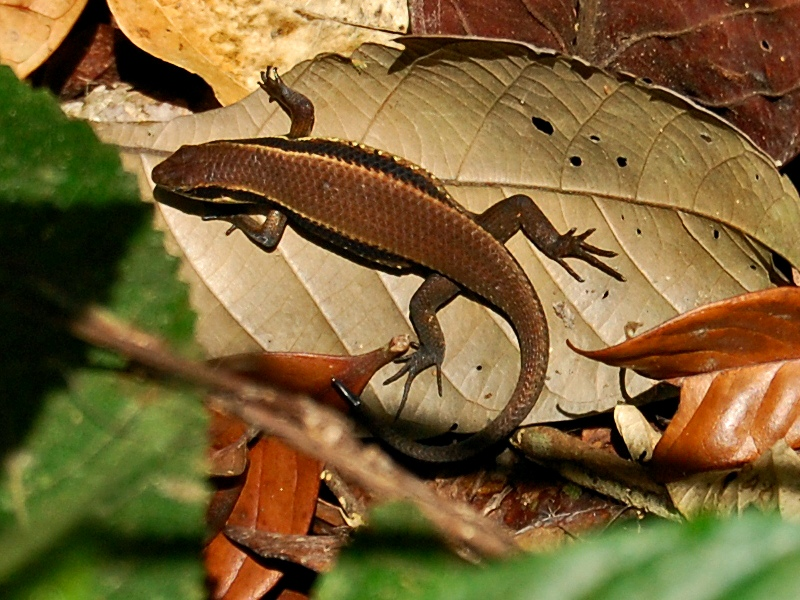
- From Upper Seruyan, Central Kalimantan

Conservation status
- Least Concern (IUCN 3.1)

Scientific classification
- Kingdom: Animalia
- Phylum: Chordata
- Class: Reptilia
- Order: Squamata
- Family: Scincidae
- Genus: Eutropis
- Species: E. rudis

Binomial name
- Eutropis rudis (Boulenger, 1887)

Synonyms
- Mabuya rudis (Boulenger, 1887)

= Eutropis rudis =

Rough Mabuya

Species of lizard

Eutropis rudis, commonly known as the rough mabuya or brown mabuya, is a species of skink. It is found in the Maritime Southeast Asia: Indonesia (Borneo, Sumatra, Mentawai Islands, Java, and Sulawesi), Malaysia (Sabah and Sarawak), Philippine Islands, Sulu Islands, as well as on the Nicobar islands of India.
