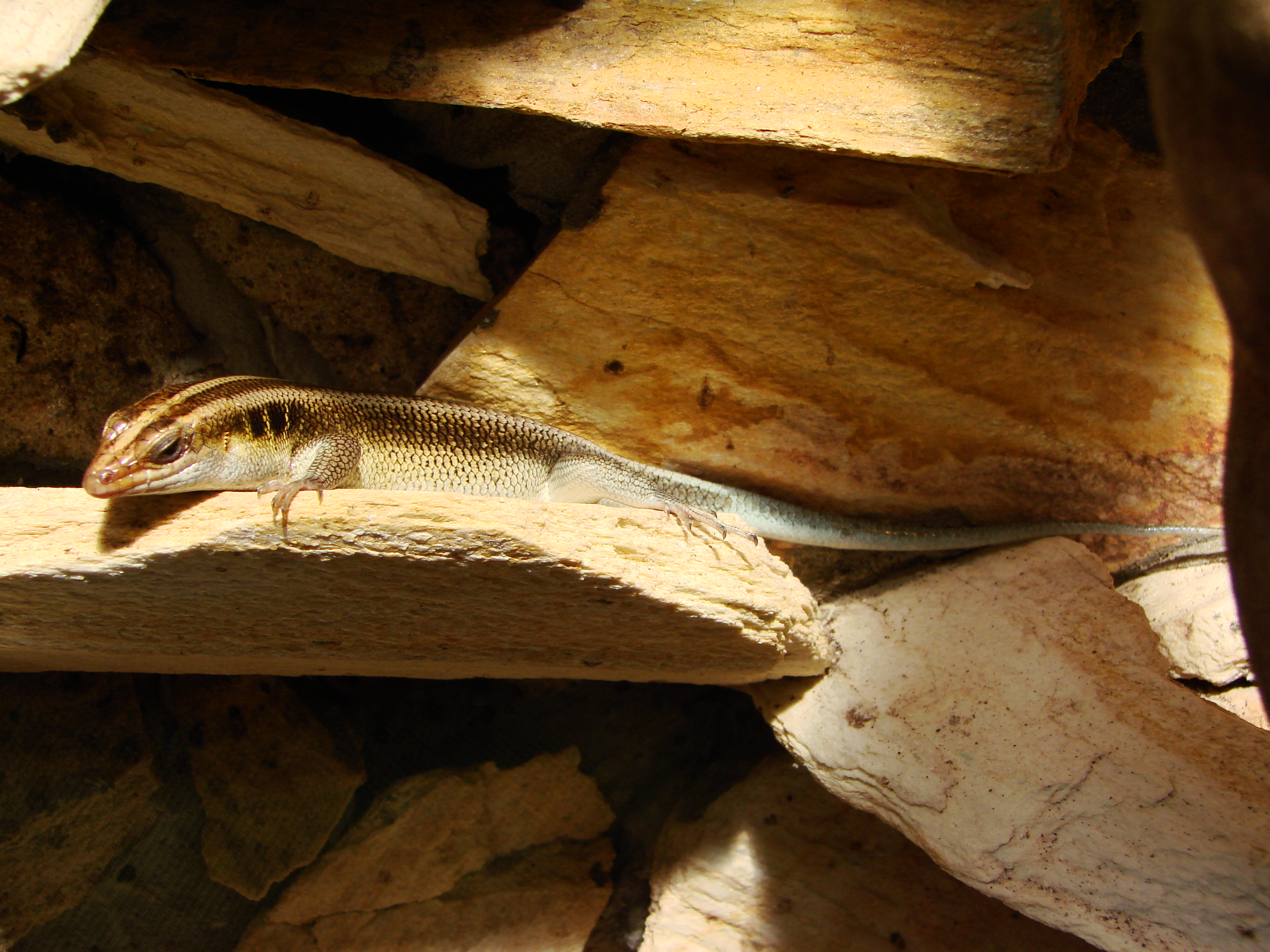

Conservation status
- Least Concern (IUCN 3.1)

Scientific classification
- Kingdom: Animalia
- Phylum: Chordata
- Class: Reptilia
- Order: Squamata
- Family: Scincidae
- Genus: Eutropis
- Species: E. quadricarinata

Binomial name
- Eutropis quadricarinata (Boulenger, 1887)

Synonyms
- Mabuya quadricarinata Boulenger, 1887

= Eutropis quadricarinata =

Beautiful mabuya

Species of lizard

Beautiful mabuya of four-lined mabuya (Eutropis quadricarinata) is a species of skink. It was previously assigned to the genus Mabuya, but following splitting up of this genus, the beautiful mabuya was assigned to the genus Eutropis. Distribution: India, Myanmar Type locality: Bhamo and hills to the east
