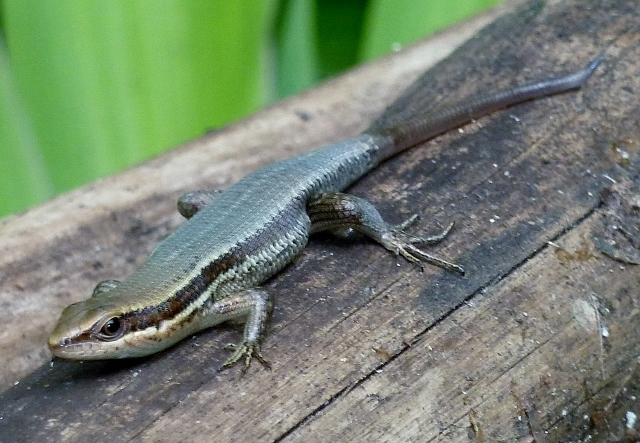

Conservation status
- Least Concern (IUCN 3.1)

Scientific classification
- Kingdom: Animalia
- Phylum: Chordata
- Class: Reptilia
- Order: Squamata
- Family: Scincidae
- Genus: Eutropis
- Species: E. indeprensa

Binomial name
- Eutropis indeprensa (Brown & Alcala, 1980)

= Eutropis indeprensa =

Species of lizard

Eutropis indeprensa, commonly known as Brown's mabuya, is a species of skink found in Indonesia, Malaysia, and the Philippines.
