= Eutropis chapaensis =

Conservation status
- Least Concern (IUCN 3.1)

Scientific classification
- Kingdom: Animalia
- Phylum: Chordata
- Class: Reptilia
- Order: Squamata
- Family: Scincidae
- Genus: Eutropis
- Species: E. chapaensis

Binomial name
- Eutropis chapaensis (Bourret, 1937)

Species of lizard

The Sapa mabouya (Eutropis chapaensis) is a species of skink found in Vietnam.
