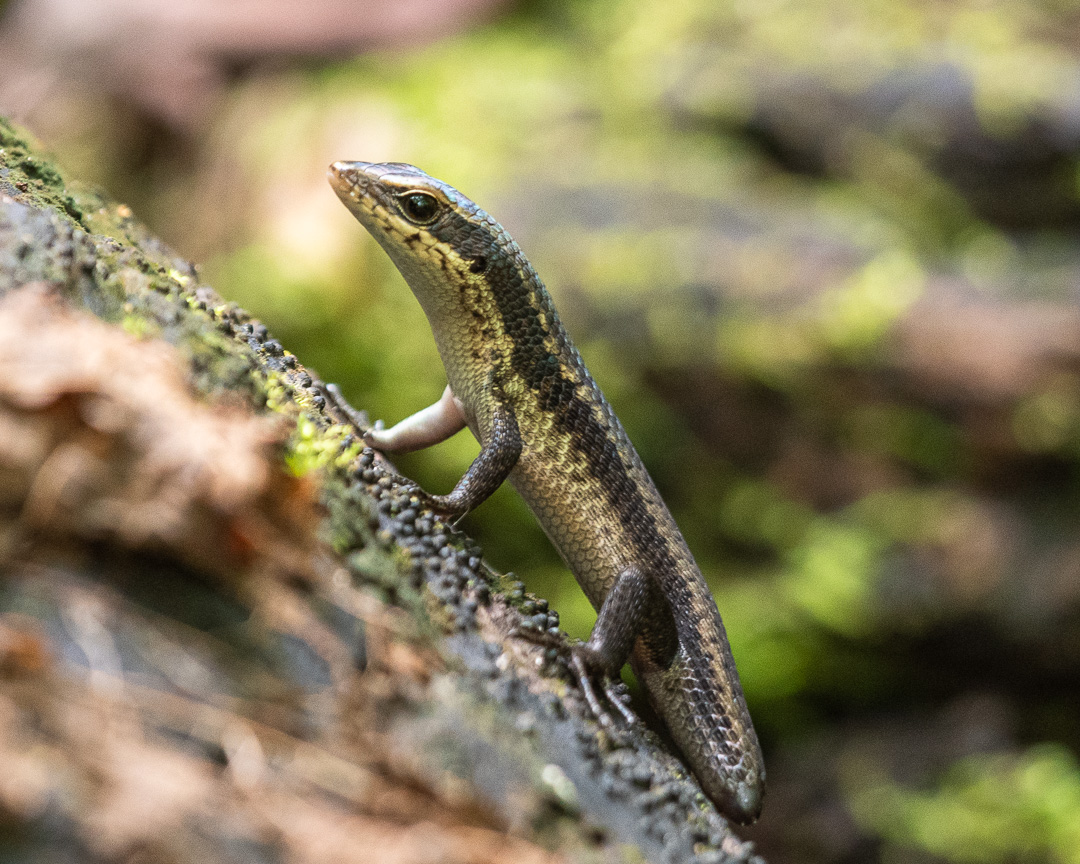

Conservation status
- Least Concern (IUCN 3.1)

Scientific classification
- Kingdom: Animalia
- Phylum: Chordata
- Class: Reptilia
- Order: Squamata
- Suborder: Scinciformata
- Infraorder: Scincomorpha
- Family: Mabuyidae
- Genus: Eutropis
- Species: E. andamanensis

Binomial name
- Eutropis andamanensis (Smith, 1935)

Synonyms
- Mabuya andamanensis Smith, 1935

= Eutropis andamanensis =

Species of lizard

The Andaman Islands grass skink (Eutropis andamanensis) is a species of skink found in the Andaman Islands of India.
