= Eutropis cuprea =

Conservation status
- Least Concern (IUCN 3.1)

Scientific classification
- Kingdom: Animalia
- Phylum: Chordata
- Class: Reptilia
- Order: Squamata
- Family: Scincidae
- Genus: Eutropis
- Species: E. cuprea

Binomial name
- Eutropis cuprea Barley, Diesmos, Siler, Martinez, & Brown, 2020

Species of lizard

The copper sun skink (Eutropis cuprea) is a species of skink found in the Philippines.
