= Eutropis quadratilobus =

Conservation status
- Endangered (IUCN 3.1)

Scientific classification
- Kingdom: Animalia
- Phylum: Chordata
- Class: Reptilia
- Order: Squamata
- Family: Scincidae
- Genus: Eutropis
- Species: E. quadratilobus

Binomial name
- Eutropis quadratilobus (Bauer & Günther, 1992)

Species of lizard

Eutropis quadratilobus is a species of skink found in Bhutan.
