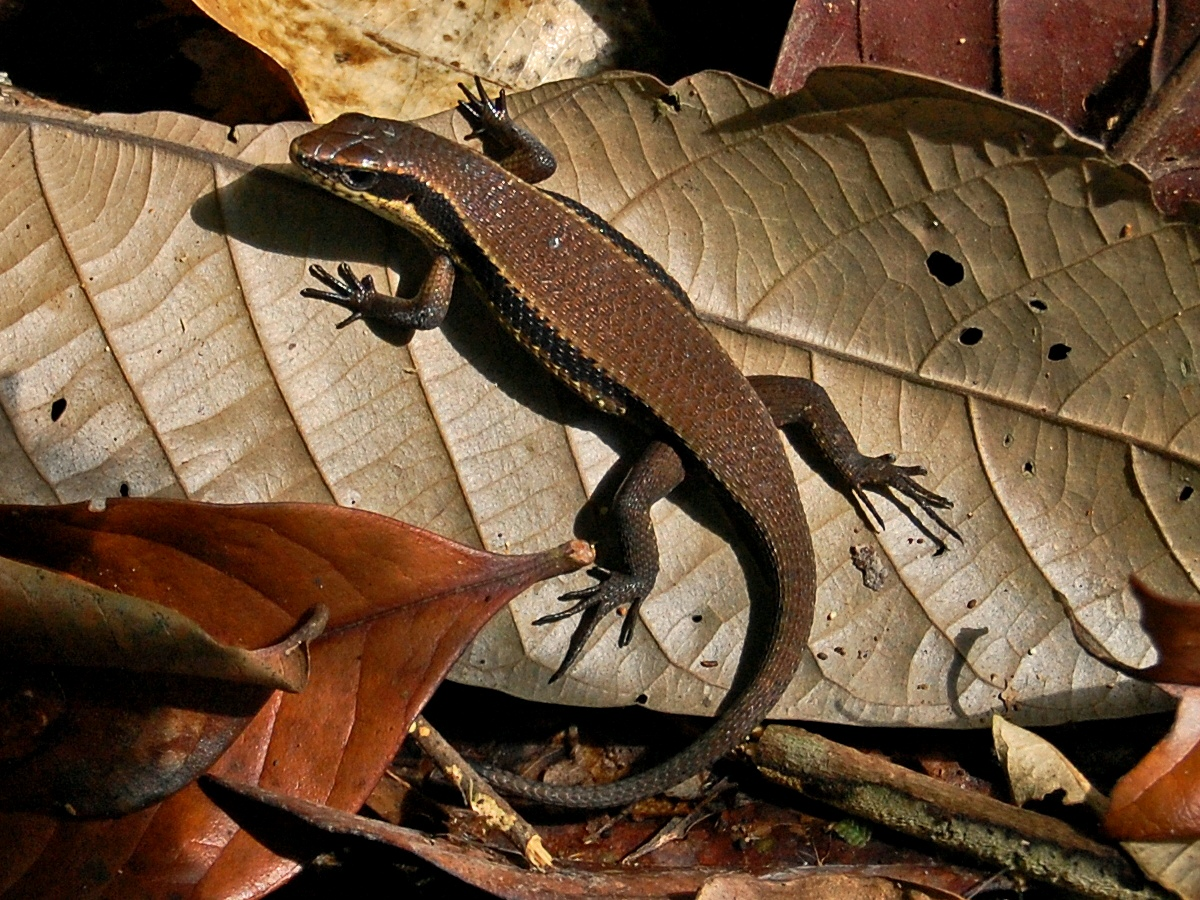
- Eutropis lewisi from Central Kalimantan, Indonesia

Scientific classification
- Kingdom: Animalia
- Phylum: Chordata
- Class: Reptilia
- Order: Squamata
- Family: Scincidae
- Genus: Eutropis
- Species: E. lewisi

Binomial name
- Eutropis lewisi (Bartlett, 1895)

= Eutropis lewisi =

Species of lizard

Lewis's mabuya (Eutropis lewisi) is a species of skink found in Indonesia.
