= Eutropis palauensis =

Scientific classification
- Kingdom: Animalia
- Phylum: Chordata
- Class: Reptilia
- Order: Squamata
- Family: Scincidae
- Genus: Eutropis
- Species: E. palauensis

Binomial name
- Eutropis palauensis Barley, Diesmos, Siler, Martinez, & Brown, 2020

Species of lizard

Palau sun skink (Eutropis palauensis) is a species of skink found in the Caroline Islands and Palau.
