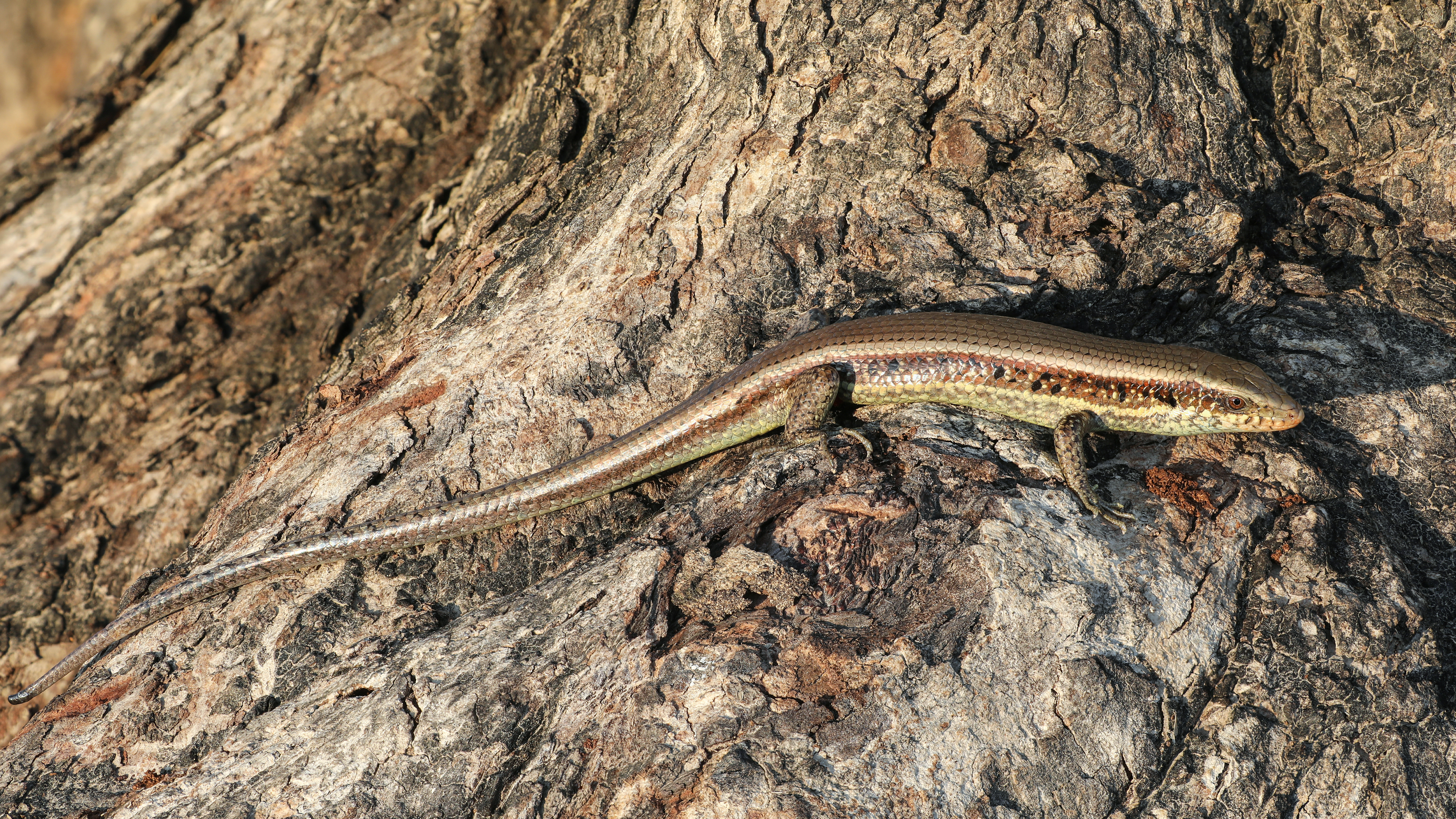
- Eutropis macularia on a tree trunk, in Laos

Scientific classification
- Kingdom: Animalia
- Phylum: Chordata
- Class: Reptilia
- Order: Squamata
- Family: Scincidae
- Subfamily: Mabuyinae
- Genus: Eutropis; Fitzinger, 1843

Type species
- Gongylus sebae A.M.C. Duméril & Bibron, 1839

Species
- 48 sp., see text

= Eutropis =

Genus of lizards

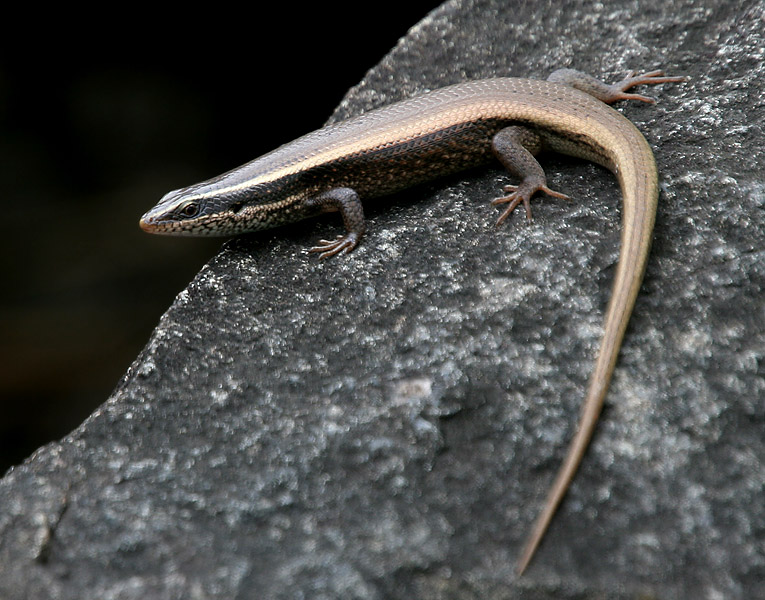
Eutropis macularia, bronze grass skink, at Pocharam lake, Andhra Pradesh, India.

Eutropis is a genus of skinks belonging to the subfamily Mabuyinae. For long, this genus was included in the "wastebin taxon" Mabuya; it contains the Asian mabuyas. They often share their habitat with the related common skinks (Sphenomorphus), but they do not compete significantly as their ecological niches differ. This genus also contains the only member of the subfamily to occur in Australasia, the many-lined sun skink (Eutropis multifasciata), whose wide range includes New Guinea.

== Description ==
They are mid-sized to largish lizards with cylindrical bodies, tails of medium length, and well-developed arms and legs; the hands and feet have 5 toes each. Their cycloid scales are underlaid by osteoderms; the scales on the back and belly are similar in shape, but those on the back are keeled. The scales on the top of the head are generally flat and subimbricate; they have a pair of supranasal scales and the frontoparietal and prefrontal scales are paired or fused. The second supraocular scale is the hindmost one that contacts the frontal scale, and the tertiary temporal scale extends forward to separate the secondary temporal scales. The nasal scale is undivided.

Eutropis mabuyas have 26 presacral vertebrae. Their palatine bones are in contact with the median; the deep sphenopalatine notch separates the pterygoids and extends forwards to between the centre of the eyes. The fairly small teeth are pleurodont, and the pterygoid always bears teeth. The ear opening is small, and the eardrums are hidden in a moderately deep ear canal.

== Species ==
Eutropis includes the following species:

- Eutropis alcalai Barley, Sanguila & R.M. Brown, 2021
- Eutropis allapallensis (K.P. Schmidt, 1926) – Allapalli grass skink, Schmidt's mabuya
- Eutropis andamanensis (M.A. Smith, 1935) – Andaman Islands grass skink
- Eutropis ashwamedhi (Sharma, 1969) – Ashwamedh writhing skink, Ashwamedha supple skink
- Eutropis austini Batuwita, 2016
- Eutropis beddomei (Jerdon, 1870) – Beddome's mabuya
- Eutropis bibronii (Gray, 1839) – Bibron's skink, seashore skink
- Eutropis bontocensis (Taylor, 1923) – Luzon montane mabuya
- Eutropis borealis (W.C. Brown & Alcala, 1980)
- Eutropis brevis (Günther, 1875)
- Eutropis caraga Barley, Diesmos, Siler, Martinez & W.C. Brown, 2020 – Caraga sun skink
- Eutropis carinata (Schneider, 1801) – keeled Indian mabuya, many-keeled grass skink, "golden skink"
- Eutropis chapaensis (Bourret, 1937) – Sapa mabuya
- Eutropis clivicola (Inger et al., 1984) – Inger's mabuya
- Eutropis cumingi (W.C. Brown & Alcala, 1980) – Cuming's mabuya, Cuming's eared skink
- Eutropis cuprea Barley, Diesmos, Siler, Martinez & W.C. Brown, 2020 – copper sun skink
- Eutropis darevskii (Bobrov, 1992) – Darevsky's mabouya, Darevsky's mabuya, Darevsky's skink
- Eutropis dattaroyi Amarasinghe, Chandramouli, Deuti, P.D. Campbell, Henkanaththegedara & Karunarathna, 2020
- Eutropis dawsoni (Annandale, 1909) – Gans's grass skink
- Eutropis englei (Taylor, 1925) – six-striped mabuya
- Eutropis floweri (Taylor, 1950) – Taylor's striped mabuya
- Eutropis greeri Batuwita, 2016
- Eutropis gubataas Barley, Diesmos, Siler, Martinez & W.C. Brown, 2020 – upland sun skink
- Eutropis indeprensa (W.C. Brown & Alcala, 1980) – Brown's mabuya
- Eutropis innotata (Blanford, 1870) – Blanford's mabuya
- Eutropis islamaliit Barley, Diesmos, Siler, Martinez & W.C. Brown, 2020 – striking Philippine sun skink
- Eutropis lankae Deraniyagala, 1953
- Eutropis lapulapu Barley, Diesmos, Siler, Martinez & W.C. Brown, 2020 – Lapu-lapu’s sun skink
- Eutropis lewisi (Bartlett, 1895) – Lewis’s mabuya
- Eutropis longicaudata (Hallowell, 1857) – longtail mabuya, long-tailed sun skink
- Eutropis macrophthalma (Mausfeld & Böhme, 2002)
- Eutropis macularia (Blyth, 1853) – bronze mabuya, bronze grass skink
- Eutropis madaraszi (Méhelÿ, 1897) – Sri Lanka bronze mabuya
- Eutropis multicarinata (Gray, 1845)
- Eutropis multifasciata (Kuhl, 1820) – East Indian brown mabuya, many-lined sun skink, many-striped skink, common sun skink, golden skink
- Eutropis nagarjuni (Sharma, 1969) – Sharma's mabuya
- Eutropis palauensis Barley, Diesmos, Siler, Martinez & W.C. Brown, 2020 – Palau sun skink
- Eutropis quadratilobus (Bauer & R. Günther, 1992)
- Eutropis quadricarinata (Boulenger, 1887) – beautiful mabuya
- Eutropis resetarii Batuwita, Udugampala & Edirisinghe, 2020
- Eutropis rudis (Boulenger, 1887) – rough mabuya, brown mabuya
- Eutropis rugifera (Stoliczka, 1870) – Nicobar Island skink, Sulawesi bronze bush skink
- Eutropis sahulinghangganan Barley, Diesmos, Siler, Martinez & W.C. Brown, 2020 – Palawan sun skink
- Eutropis sibalom Barley, Diesmos, Siler, Martinez & W.C. Brown, 2020 – Sibalom sun skink
- Eutropis tammanna Das, de Silva & Austin, 2008 – Tammanna skink
- Eutropis trivittata (Hardwicke & Gray, 1827) – three-banded mabuya
- Eutropis tytleri (Theobald, 1868) – Tytler's mabuya
- Eutropis vertebralis (Boulenger, 1887)

Nota bene: A binomial authority in parentheses indicates that the species was originally described in a genus other than Eutropis.
