= Eutropis bontocensis =

Conservation status
- Least Concern (IUCN 3.1)

Scientific classification
- Kingdom: Animalia
- Phylum: Chordata
- Class: Reptilia
- Order: Squamata
- Family: Scincidae
- Genus: Eutropis
- Species: E. bontocensis

Binomial name
- Eutropis bontocensis (Taylor, 1923)
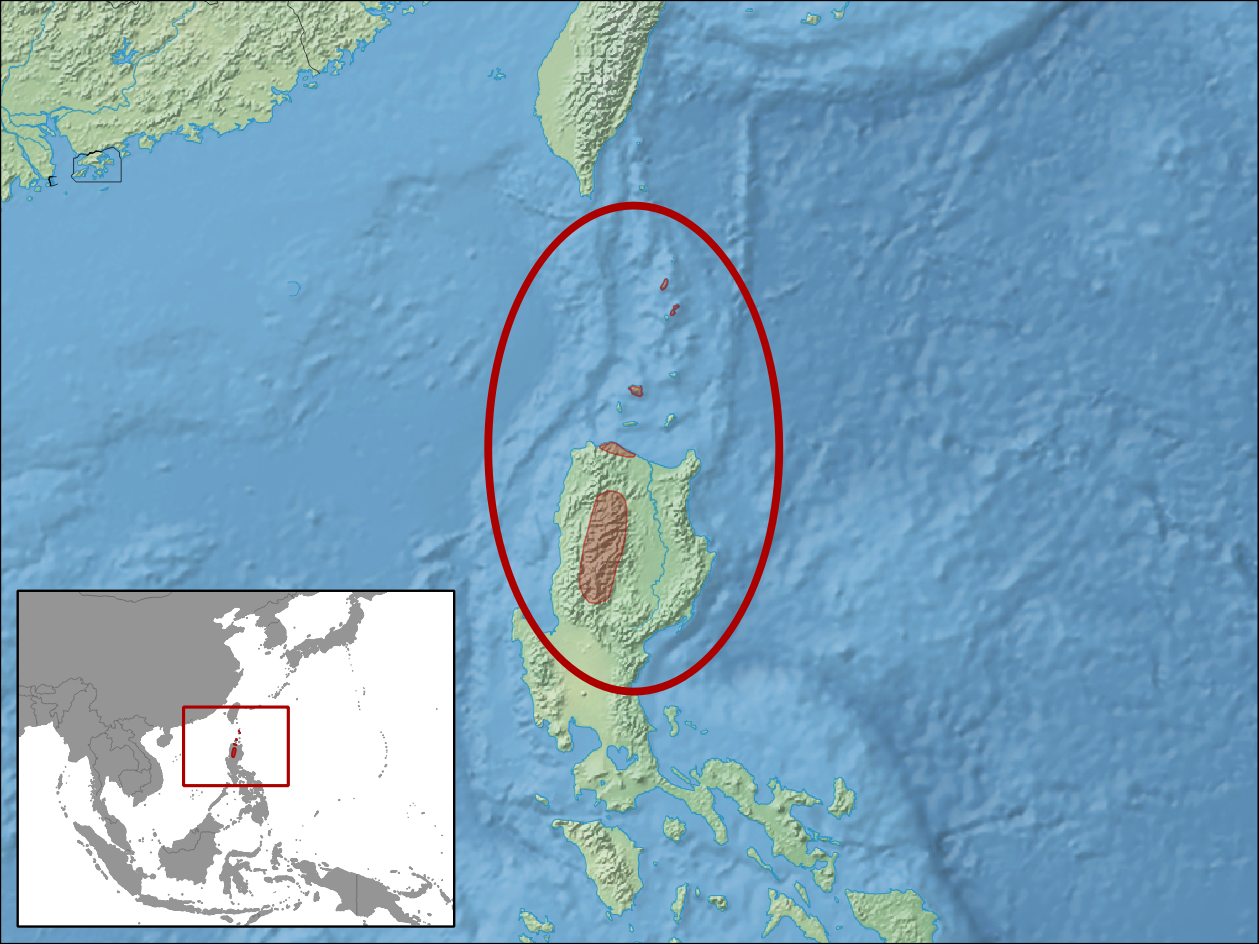

Species of lizard

The Luzon montane mabouya (Eutropis bontocensis) is a species of skink found in Luzon in the Philippines.
