= Eutropis englei =

Conservation status
- Least Concern (IUCN 3.1)

Scientific classification
- Kingdom: Animalia
- Phylum: Chordata
- Class: Reptilia
- Order: Squamata
- Family: Scincidae
- Genus: Eutropis
- Species: E. englei

Binomial name
- Eutropis englei (Taylor, 1925)
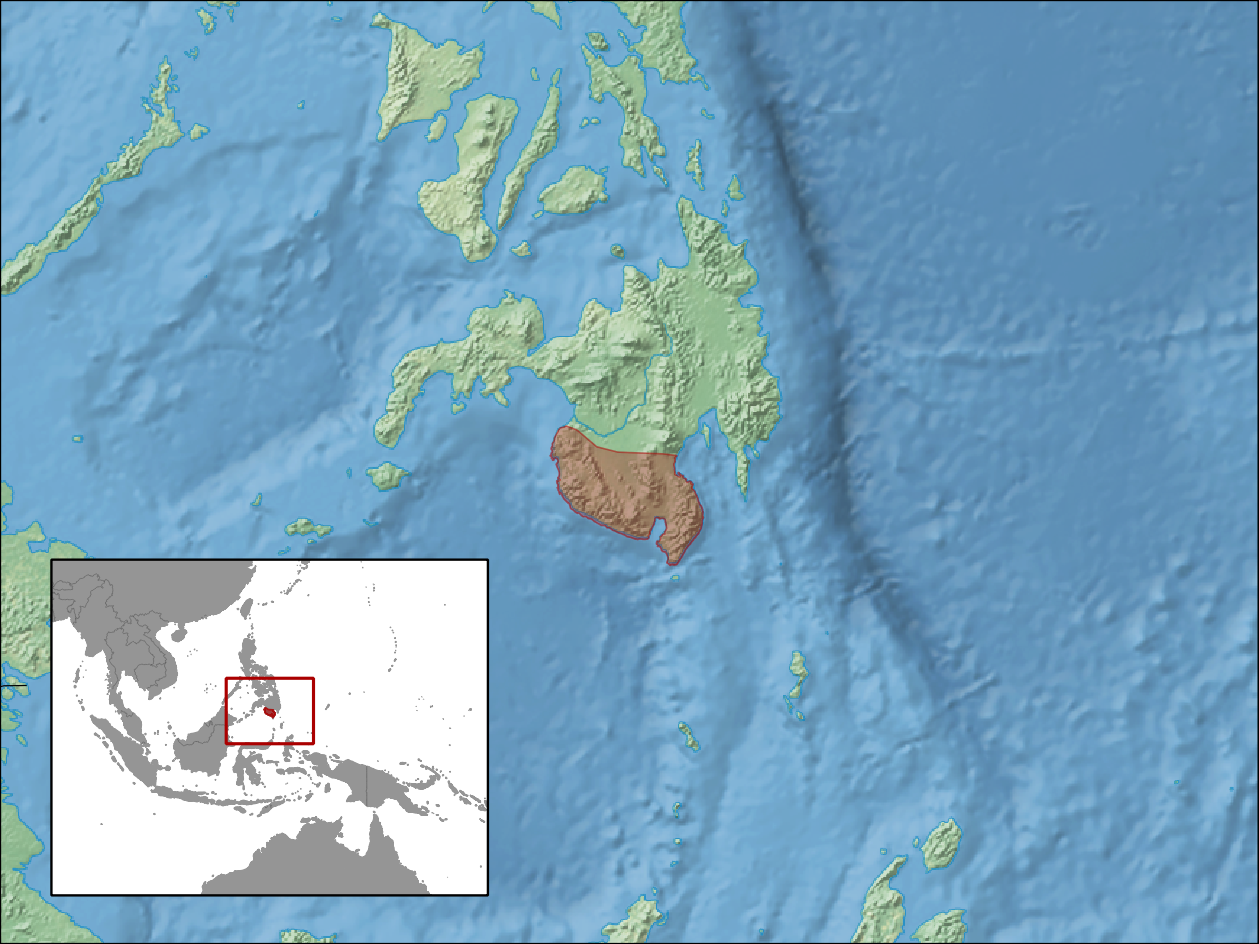

Synonyms
- Mabuya englei Taylor, 1925; Eutropis englei — Mausfeld et al., 2002

Species of lizard

Eutropis englei, also known commonly as Engel's mabuya and the six-striped mabouya, is a species of skink, a lizard in the family Scincidae. The species is endemic to Mindanao in the Philippines.

== Etymology ==
The specific name, englei, is in honor of Captain Francis G. Engle (1888–1974) of the United States Coast and Geodetic Survey.

== Habitat ==
The preferred natural habitat of E. englei is low vegetation near mouths of streams and along beaches.

== Reproduction ==
The mode of reproduction of E. englei is unknown.
