= Eutropis brevis =

Scientific classification
- Kingdom: Animalia
- Phylum: Chordata
- Class: Reptilia
- Order: Squamata
- Family: Scincidae
- Genus: Eutropis
- Species: E. brevis

Binomial name
- Eutropis brevis (Günther, 1875)

Species of lizard

Eutropis brevis is a species of skink found in India.
