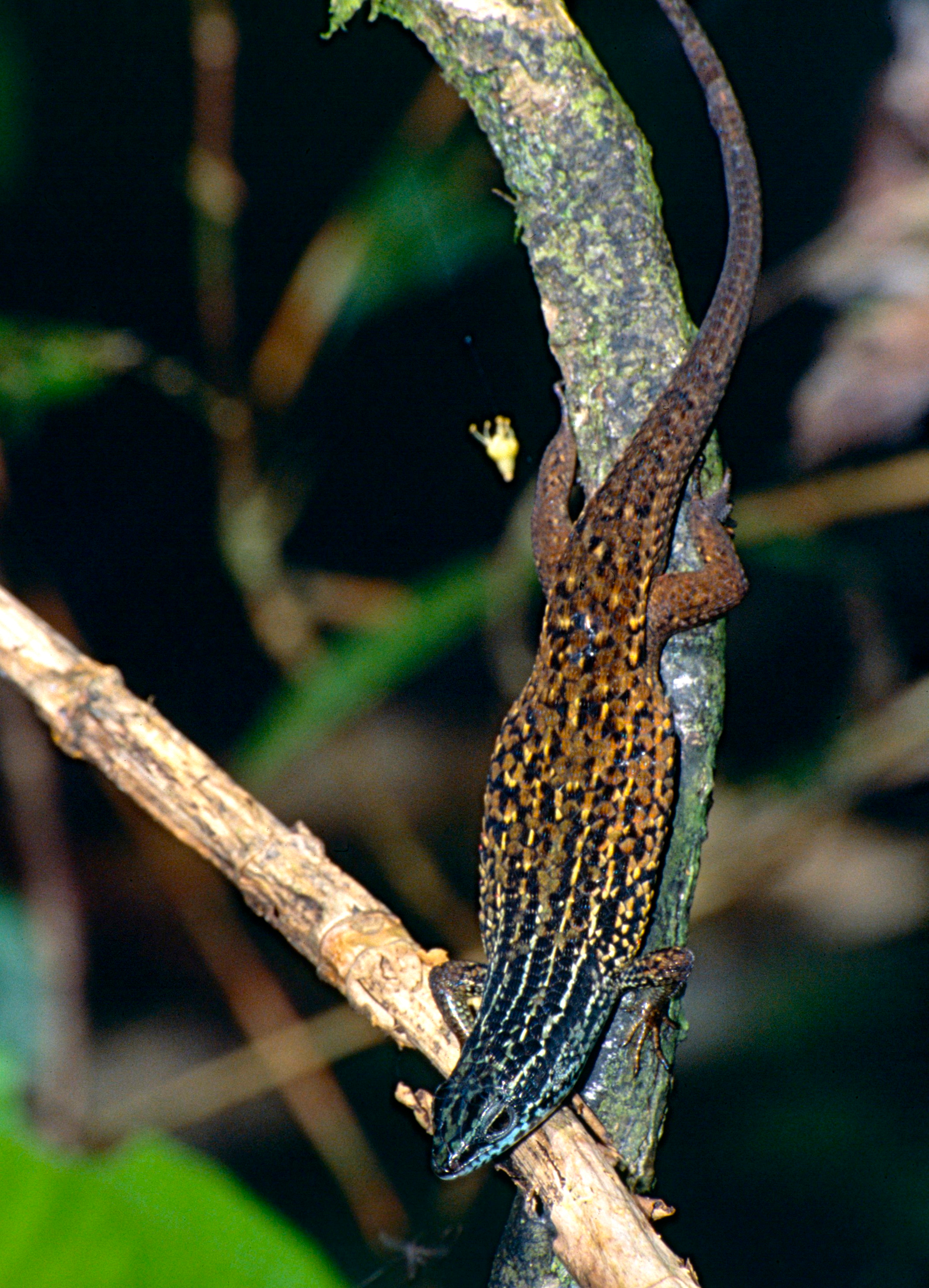

Conservation status
- Least Concern (IUCN 3.1)

Scientific classification
- Kingdom: Animalia
- Phylum: Chordata
- Class: Reptilia
- Order: Squamata
- Family: Scincidae
- Genus: Eutropis
- Species: E. rugifera

Binomial name
- Eutropis rugifera (Stoliczka, 1870)

Synonyms
- Tiliqua rugifera Stoliczka, 1870; Mabuya rugifera (Stoliczka, 1870)

= Eutropis rugifera =

Species of lizard

Eutropis rugifera, variously known as Nicobar Island skink or rough-scaled sun skink, is a species of skink from southeastern Asia.

== Description ==
Snout short, obtuse. Lower eyelid scaly. Nostril behind vertical of suture between rostral and first labial; no postnasal; anterior loreal not deeper but much smaller than second; frontonasal broader than long, largely in contact with the rostral and with the frontal: the latter shield longer than the frontoparietals and interparietal together, in contact with the first and second supraoculars; 4 supraoculars, second largest; 6 supraciliaries, first largest; fronto-parietals distinct, larger than the interparietal; a pair of nuchals; 5 (or 4) labials anterior to the subocular, which is large and not narrower below. Ear-opening very small, oval, horizontal, with projecting granules round its border. Dorsal, nuchal, and lateral scales very strongly quinquecarinate; 26 scales round the body, of which 8 or 10 are smooth. The hind limb reaches the elbow of the adpressed fore limb. Subdigital lamellae smooth. Scales on upper surface of tibia bicarinate. Tail 1.6 times the length of head and body. Dark olive-brown above, greenish-white inferiorly. From snout to vent 2–5 inches; tail 4.5.

== Distribution ==
Eutropis rugifera occurs in the Nicobar Islands (India), Malay Peninsula (southern Thailand, Peninsular Malaysia, and Singapore), Sunda Islands (Indonesia: Sumatra, Nias, Mentawai Islands, Java, Bali; Indonesia/Malaysia: Borneo), and Mindanao (the Philippines).
