= Eutropis macrophthalma =

Conservation status
- Vulnerable (IUCN 3.1)

Scientific classification
- Kingdom: Animalia
- Phylum: Chordata
- Class: Reptilia
- Order: Squamata
- Family: Scincidae
- Genus: Eutropis
- Species: E. macrophthalma

Binomial name
- Eutropis macrophthalma (Mausfeld & Bohme, 2002)

Species of lizard

Eutropis macrophthalma is a species of skink found in Sulawesi.
