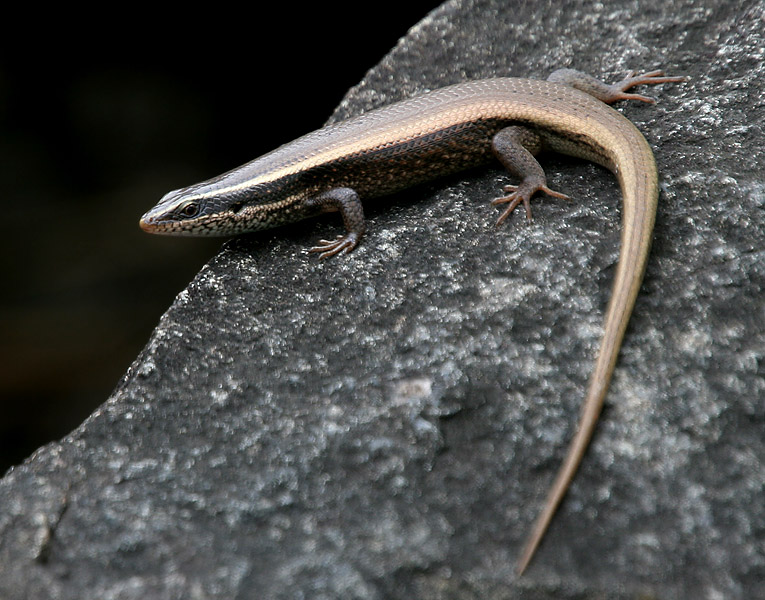
- Eutropis macularia at Pocharam, Andhra Pradesh.

Conservation status
- Least Concern (IUCN 3.1)

Scientific classification
- Kingdom: Animalia
- Phylum: Chordata
- Class: Reptilia
- Order: Squamata
- Family: Scincidae
- Genus: Eutropis
- Species: E. macularia

Binomial name
- Eutropis macularia (Blyth, 1853)

Synonyms
- Mabuya macularia (Blyth, 1853)

= Eutropis macularia =

Species of lizard

The bronze grass skink, bronze mabuya or speckled forest skink (Eutropis macularia), is a species of skink found in South and Southeast Asia. It is a common, but shy, ground-dwelling species that is active both day and night.

== Description ==
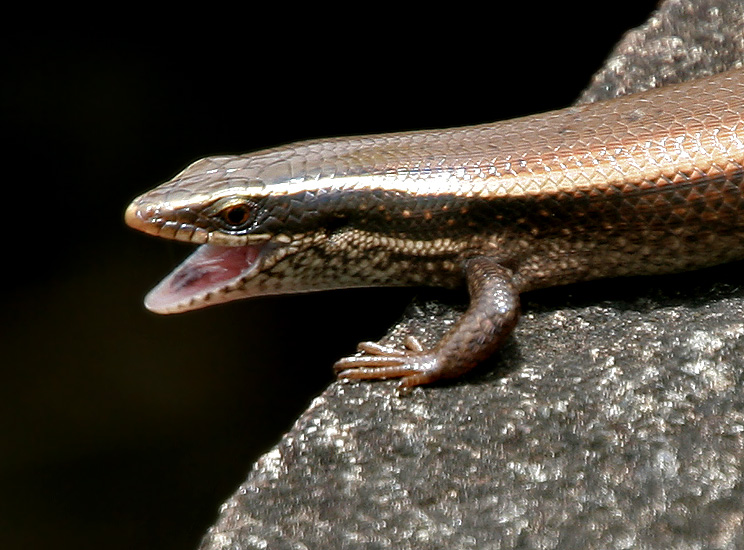
at Pocharam Lake, Andhra Pradesh

The bronze grass skink has a cylindrical body, dorsal scales with 5–8 keels, and smooth ventral scales. A pair of dorso-lateral bands start from above the eye and extend to the base of the tail. As with other Eutropis species, the scales are keeled. The snout is short, obtusely keeled and acuminate, and the lower eyelid is scaly. The nostril is located behind the vertical suture between the rostral scale and the first labial scale. The ear-opening is oval, about the same size as a lateral scale, or a little smaller. The dorsal, nuchal, and lateral scales have five to seven sharp keels, and there are 26 to 30 scales, approximately equal in size, round the middle of the body. The adpressed limbs meet or overlap. The digits are short and the lamellae between them smooth. The tail is 1.25 to 1.75 times the length of the head and body. Brown or olive-brown above, sides darker and usually with white black-edged spots; back uniform, or black-spotted, or with one or two black longitudinal lines; sometimes there are two light lateral lines on each side, clearly delineated only in the neck region; the underparts are yellowish (in preserved specimens). Deep-brown, olive or bronze-brown in color; dorso-lateral bands light or yellow; sometimes with black spots on the base of the tail. Breeding males have orange color on the lateral side of the body. Juveniles are grey with a bronze head. Maximum length 23 cm (9 in), but a more common length is 16 cm (6 in), with a snout-to-vent length of 7 cm (2.8 in).

On the leg, just above the ankle, there is a specialized group of scales which form a chigger-mite refuge.

== Distribution and habitat ==
This skink is found in Bangladesh, Bhutan, Cambodia, India, Laos, Malaysia (northwestern), Myanmar, Nepal, Pakistan, Sri Lanka, Thailand and Vietnam. Type locality is Rangpur, Bengal [Bangladesh]. It lives in both deciduous and evergreen forests, in plantations, among leaf litter, in grasslands, and in rocky areas with scattered trees, at altitudes up to about 1,500 m (5,000 ft).

== Ecology ==
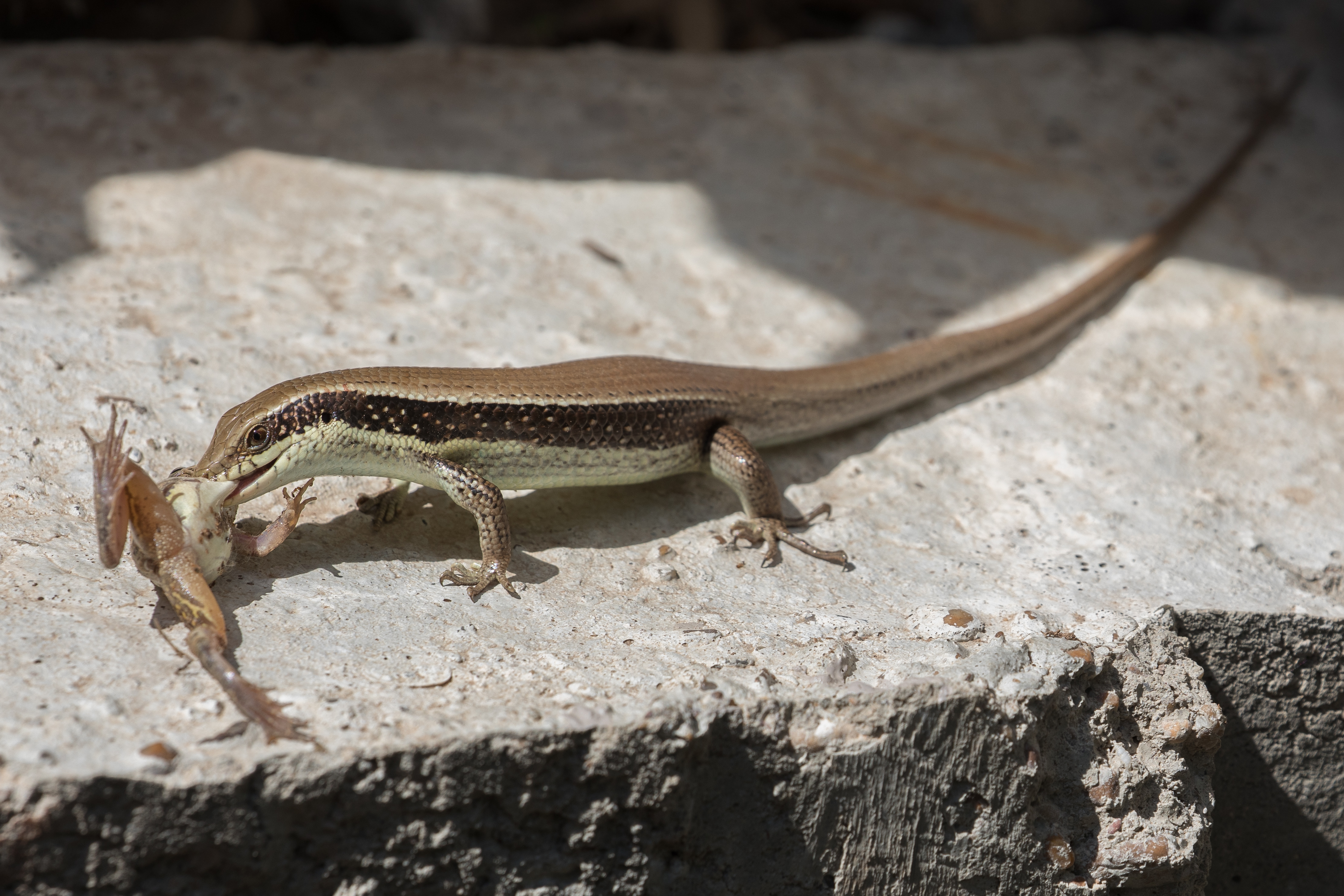
Eutropis macularia eating a frog in Laos.

Like other skinks, the bronze grass skink feeds on insects and other invertebrates. It hides in holes in the ground, in crevices and under rocks. The females lay several small clutches of eggs each year, each containing three to six eggs. In a study in the southern Western Ghats, Eutropis macularia was the most frequently encountered reptile in the plantations, orchards and gardens where the study was conducted, being active both day and night. The skink favoured areas with a high canopy, deep leaf litter, and a dense cover of shrubs and herbs. It is strictly terrestrial and is rather shy.

== Gallery ==
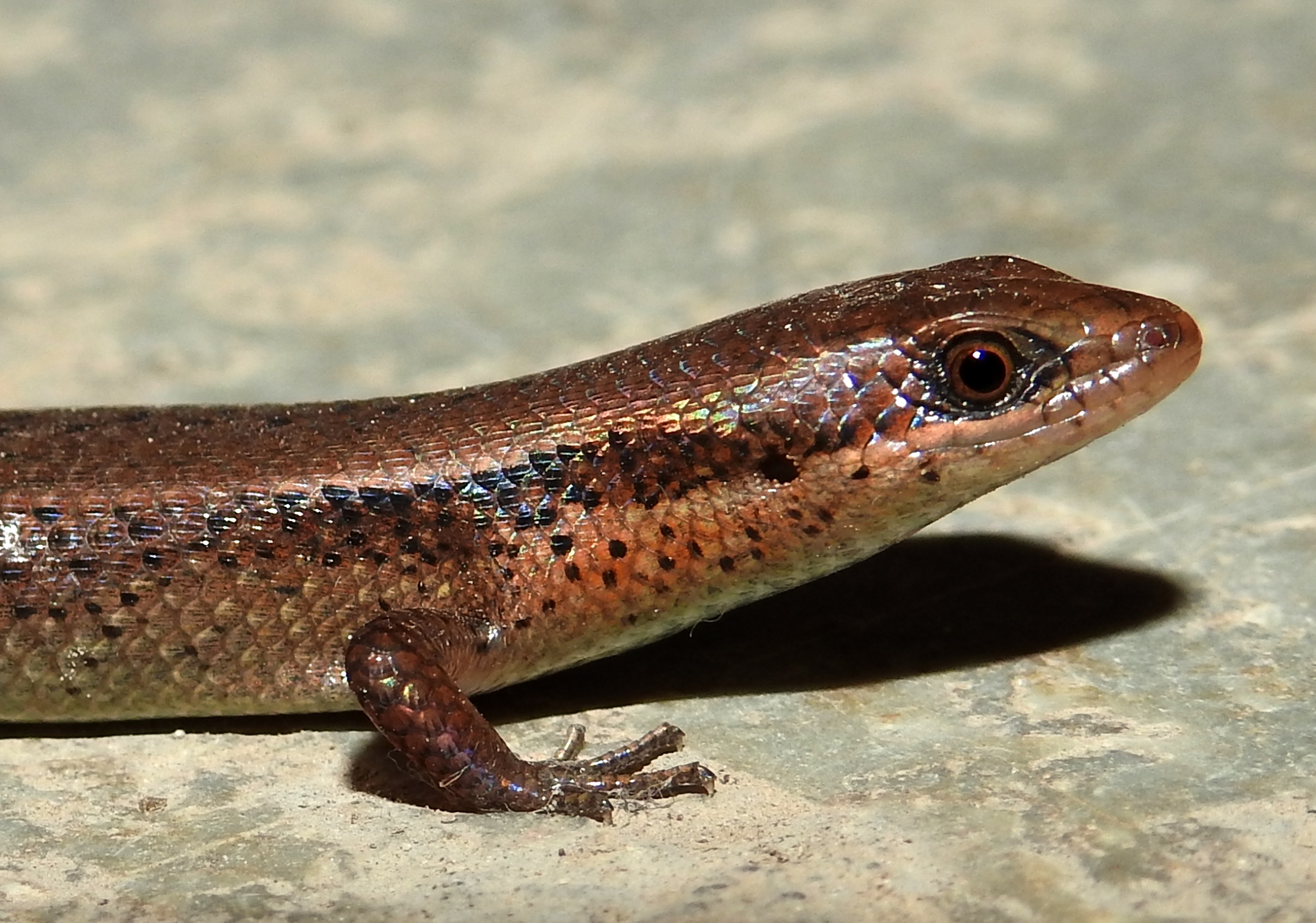
Bronze Grass Skink (Eutropis macularia) close up, at BNHS Nature Reserve (CEC), Goregaon, Mumbai, Maharashtra.

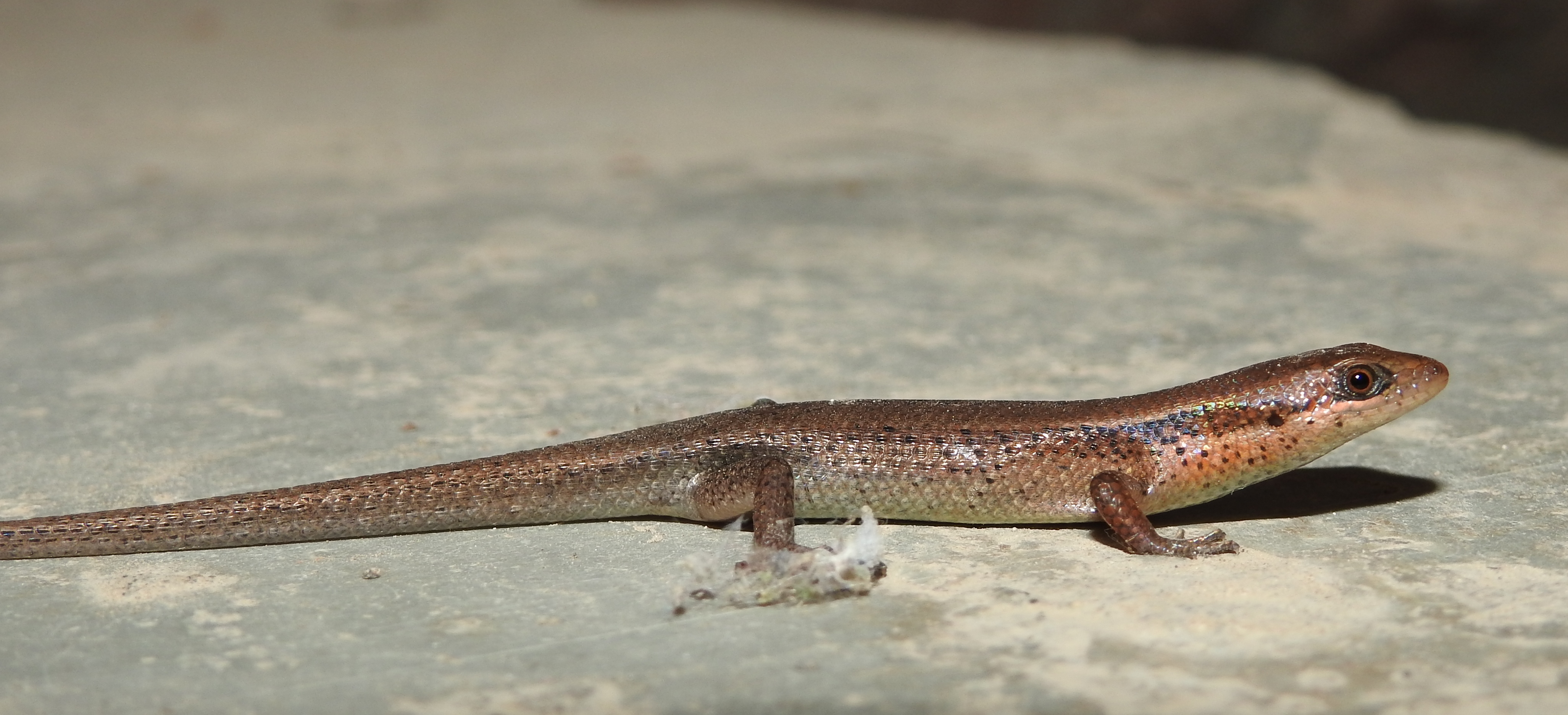
Bronze Grass Skink (Eutropis macularia), at BNHS Nature Reserve (CEC), Goregaon, Mumbai, Maharashtra.
