= Eutropis dawsoni =

Conservation status
- Data Deficient (IUCN 3.1)

Scientific classification
- Kingdom: Animalia
- Phylum: Chordata
- Class: Reptilia
- Order: Squamata
- Family: Scincidae
- Genus: Eutropis
- Species: E. dawsoni

Binomial name
- Eutropis dawsoni (Annandale, 1909)

Synonyms
- Lygosoma dawsoni Annandale, 1909; Mabuya gansi Das, 1991; Eutropis gansi — Mausfeld et al., 2002; Eutropis dawsoni — Ganesh et al., 2021

Species of lizard

Eutropis dawsoni, also known commonly as Gans's grass skink and Gans's mabuya, is a species of lizard in the family Scincidae. The species is endemic to the southern Western Ghats, India.

== Etymology ==
The specific name, dawsoni, is in honor of F.W. Dawson who was Director of the Trivandrum Museum.

The specific name of the synonym, gansi, is in honor of American herpetologist Carl Gans.

== Geographic range ==
E. dawsoni is found in Tamil Nadu and Kerala, southern India.

The type locality of the formerly recognized Eutropis gansi is "2 km NW of Muthalar Road Cross off Sengaltheri–Thalayanai road (towards Moolakasam), Kalakkad Tiger Reserve, Tirunelveli district, Tamil Nadu State, India".

== Images ==
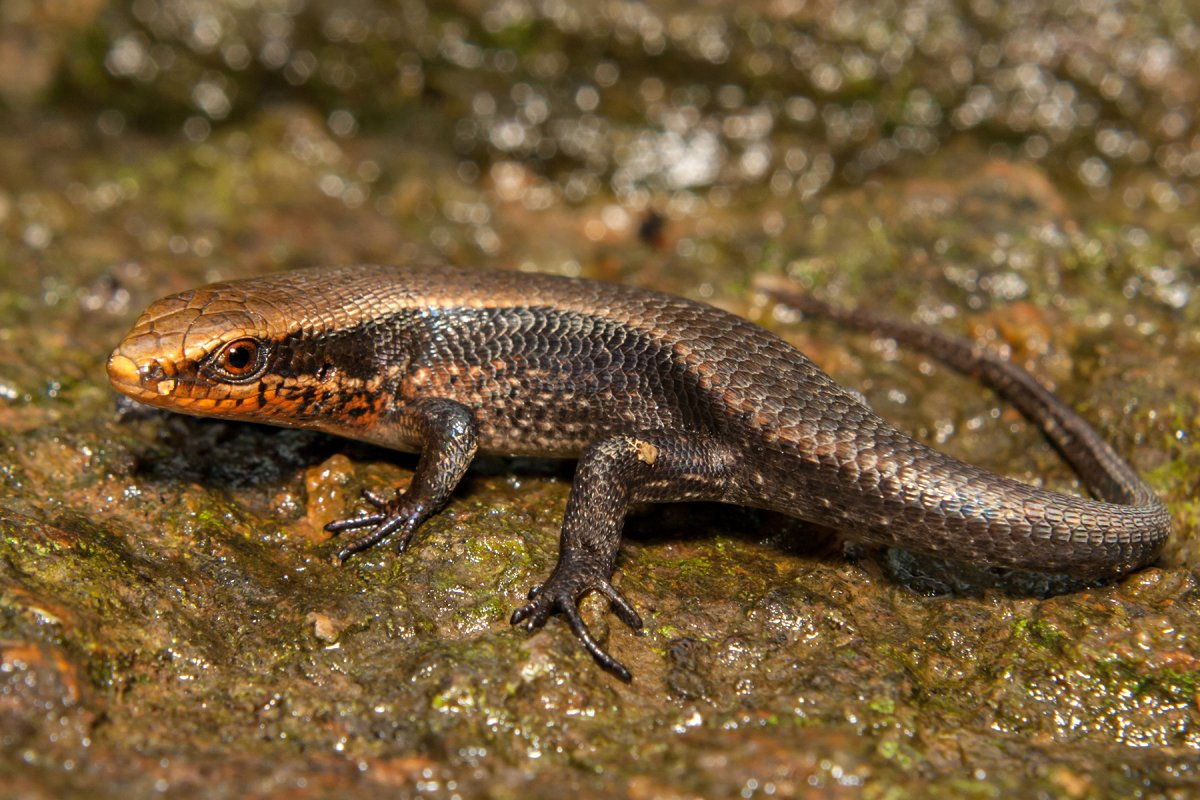
Eutropis dawsonii from Valparai,TamilNadu.

== Habitat ==
The preferred natural habitat of E. dawsoni is forest, at altitudes of 20 m (66 ft) and higher.

== Reproduction ==
The mode of reproduction of E. dawsoni is unknown.
