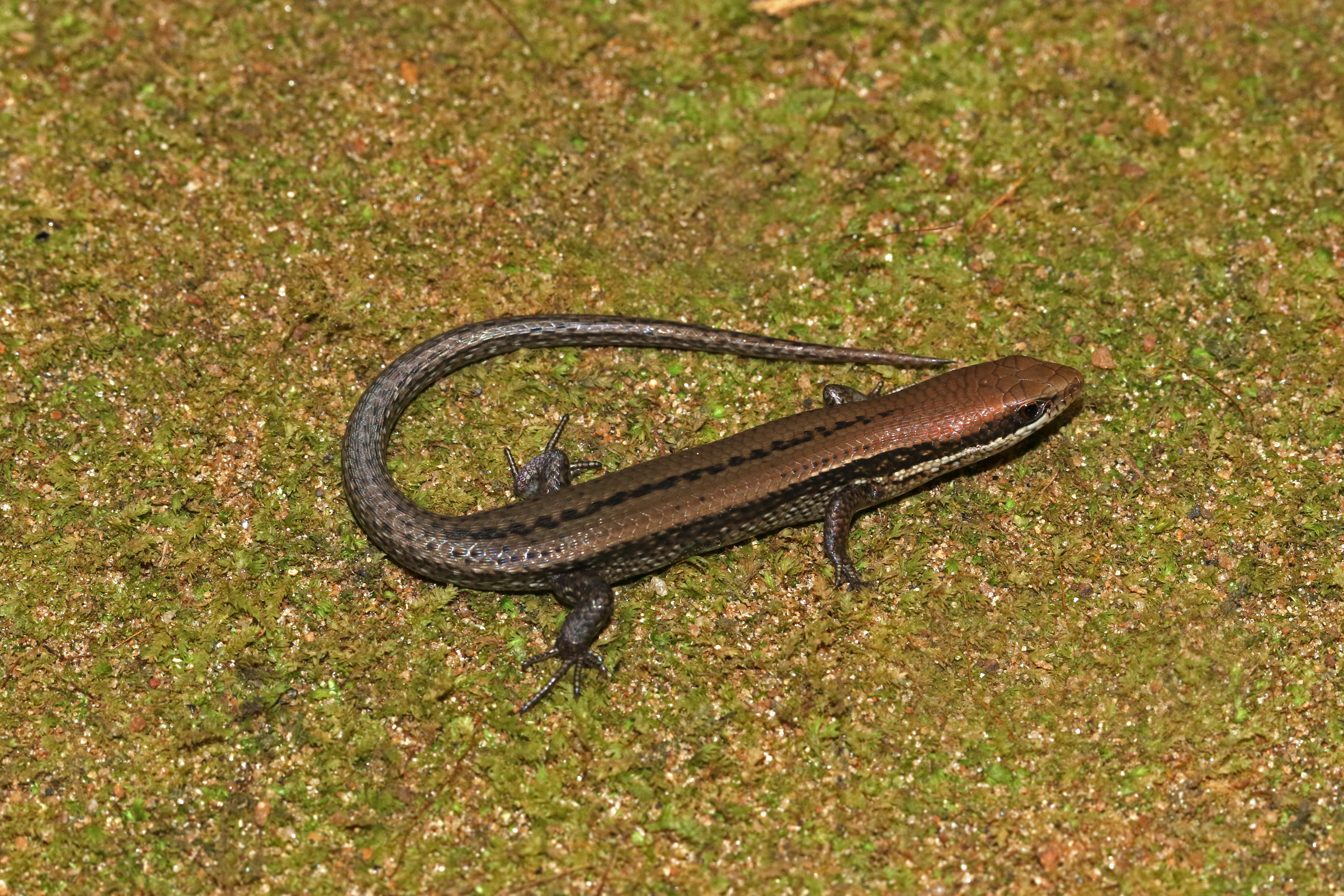

Conservation status
- Endangered (IUCN 3.1)

Scientific classification
- Kingdom: Animalia
- Phylum: Chordata
- Class: Reptilia
- Order: Squamata
- Family: Scincidae
- Genus: Eutropis
- Species: E. clivicola

Binomial name
- Eutropis clivicola (Inger, Shaffer, Koshy, & Bakde, 1984)

Synonyms
- Mabuya clivicola Inger, Shaffer, Koshy, & Bakde, 1984

= Eutropis clivicola =

Species of reptile

Eutropis clivicola, known as Inger's mabuya or mountain skink, is a species of skink found in India (Kerala). It was first formally described in 1984 as Mabuya clivicola.
