= Eutropis floweri =

Taylor's Striped Mabuya

Conservation status
- Data Deficient (IUCN 3.1)

Scientific classification
- Kingdom: Animalia
- Phylum: Chordata
- Class: Reptilia
- Order: Squamata
- Family: Scincidae
- Genus: Eutropis
- Species: E. floweri

Binomial name
- Eutropis floweri (Taylor, 1950)

Synonyms
- Mabuya floweri Taylor, 1950; Eutropis floweri — Das et al., 2008

Species of lizard

Eutropis floweri, also known commonly as Flower's skink, Taylor's skink and Taylor's striped mabuya, is a species of lizard in the family Scincidae. The species is endemic to the island of Sri Lanka. It is probably named after Stanley Smyth Flower.

== Habitat and geographic range ==
E. floweri is found in arid northeastern Sri Lanka (Trincomalee District), and in forest in central Sri Lanka.

== Description ==
E. floweri is a small, terrestrial skink. Its dorsal scales are tricarinate. The midbody scale rows number 30–32. The smooth ventral scale rows number 12. The dorsum is olive brown, with a greenish white dorso-lateral stripe running from eye to the base of the tail. There is a series of 20 paired short black narrow transverse markings running from shoulder to tail. The venter is light with a greenish cast.
