= Eutropis austini =

Conservation status
- Data Deficient (IUCN 3.1)

Scientific classification
- Kingdom: Animalia
- Phylum: Chordata
- Class: Reptilia
- Order: Squamata
- Family: Scincidae
- Genus: Eutropis
- Species: E. austini

Binomial name
- Eutropis austini Batuwita, 2016

Species of lizard

Eutropis austini is a species of skink, a lizard in the family Scincidae. The species is endemic to Sri Lanka.

== Etymology ==
The specific name, austini, is in honor of American herpetologist Christopher C. Austin.

== Habitat ==
The preferred natural habitat of E. austini is forest, at altitudes of 450–1,100 m (1,480–3,610 ft).

== Description ==
E. austini may attain a snout-to-vent length (SVL) of 7.5 cm (3.0 in). Dorsally, it is bronze brown.

== Reproduction ==
The mode of reproduction of E. austini is unknown.
