= Eutropis vertebralis =

Scientific classification
- Kingdom: Animalia
- Phylum: Chordata
- Class: Reptilia
- Order: Squamata
- Family: Scincidae
- Genus: Eutropis
- Species: E. vertebralis

Binomial name
- Eutropis vertebralis (Boulenger, 1887)

Species of lizard

Eutropis vertebralis is a species of skink found in India. It is distinguishable by its white stripes with black edges, as well as by lacking a transparent disc on its lower eyelid.
