= Eutropis madaraszi =

Conservation status
- Least Concern (IUCN 3.1)

Scientific classification
- Kingdom: Animalia
- Phylum: Chordata
- Class: Reptilia
- Order: Squamata
- Family: Scincidae
- Genus: Eutropis
- Species: E. madaraszi

Binomial name
- Eutropis madaraszi (Méhelÿ, 1897)

Synonyms
- Mabuia madaraszi Méhelÿ, 1897; Mabuya madaraszi — Das, 1996; Eutropis madaraszi — Ziesmann et al., 2007

Species of lizard

Eutropis madaraszi, also known commonly as the Sri Lanka bronze mabuya, the Sri Lanka bronze skink, or (ambiguously) the spotted skink, is a species of lizard in the family Scincidae. The species is endemic to the island of Sri Lanka.

== Etymology ==
The specific name, madaraszi, is in honor of Hungarian ornithologist Gyula Madarász of the Hungarian National Museum.

== Habitat and distribution ==
A widespread terrestrial skink, E. madaraszi has been reported from both wet and dry zones. Known localities include Colombo, as well as around Kala Wewa, and Madatugama.

== Description ==
The body of E. madaraszi is slender, with 32 midbody scale rows. The dorsum is brown, with a dark line along the flank. The venter is creamy and unpatterned.

== Ecology and diet ==
E. madaraszi is found at elevations up to 800 m (2,600 ft), in rock crevices, under leaf litter or under logs, and seen basking at midday.
