= Eutropis dattaroyi =

Scientific classification
- Kingdom: Animalia
- Phylum: Chordata
- Class: Reptilia
- Order: Squamata
- Family: Scincidae
- Genus: Eutropis
- Species: E. dattaroyi

Binomial name
- Eutropis dattaroyi Amarasinghe, Chandramouli, Deuti, Campbell, Henkanaththegedara, & Karunarathna, 2020

Species of lizard

Eutropis dattaroyi is a species of skink found on Great Nicobar Island in India.
