= Eutropis islamaliit =

Conservation status
- Data Deficient (IUCN 3.1)

Scientific classification
- Kingdom: Animalia
- Phylum: Chordata
- Class: Reptilia
- Order: Squamata
- Family: Scincidae
- Genus: Eutropis
- Species: E. islamaliit

Binomial name
- Eutropis islamaliit Barley, Diesmos, Siler, Martinez, & Brown, 2020

Species of lizard

The striking Philippine sun skink (Eutropis islamaliit) is a species of skink found in the Philippines.
