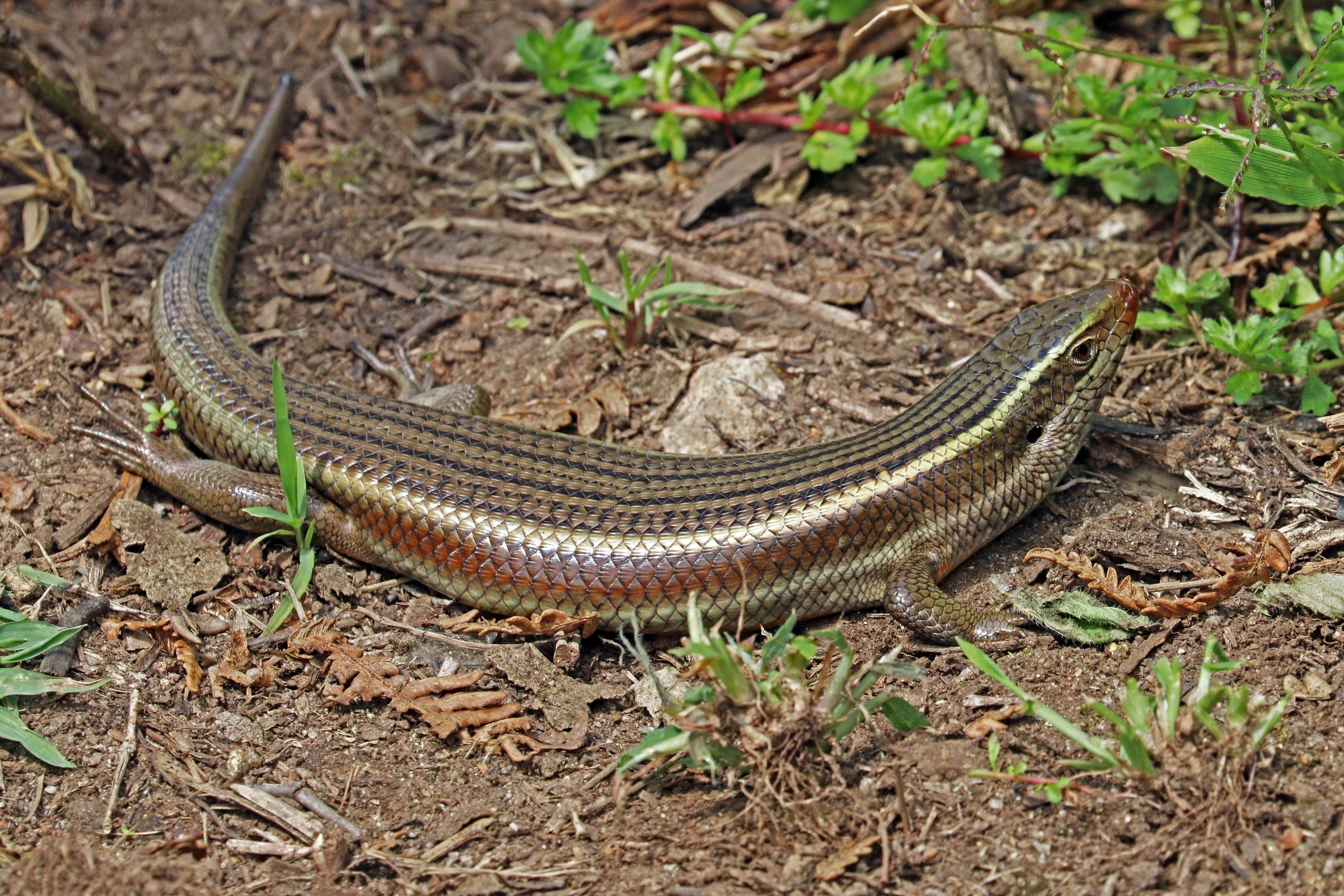
- Eravikulam National Park, Kerala, India

Conservation status
- Least Concern (IUCN 3.1)

Scientific classification
- Kingdom: Animalia
- Phylum: Chordata
- Class: Reptilia
- Order: Squamata
- Family: Scincidae
- Genus: Eutropis
- Species: E. carinata

Binomial name
- Eutropis carinata (Schneider, 1801)
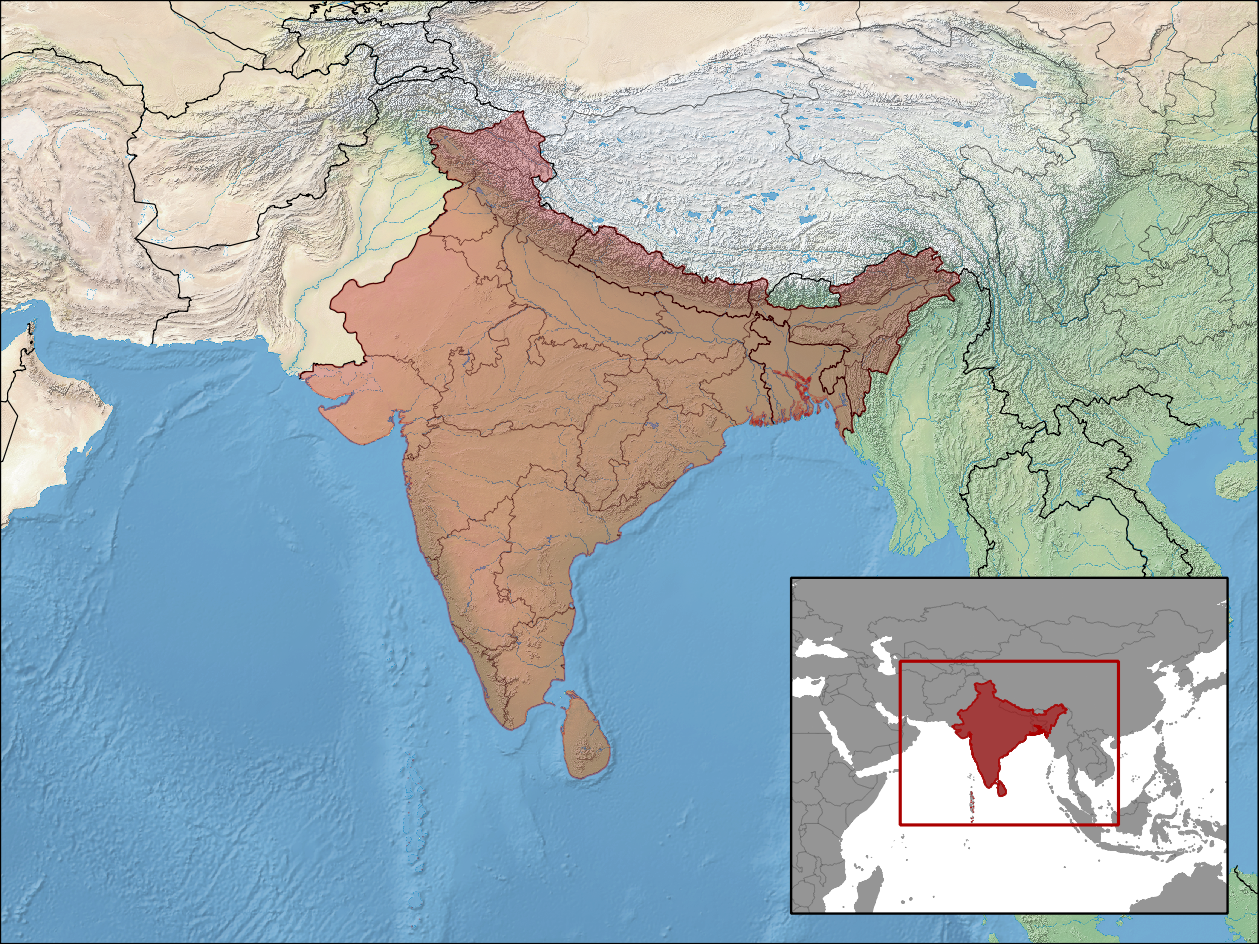

Synonyms
- Mabuya carinata (Schneider, 1801)

= Eutropis carinata =

Species of lizard

Eutropis carinata, commonly known as the keeled Indian mabuya, many-keeled grass skink or (ambiguously) "golden skink", is a species of skink found in South Asia.

== Description ==
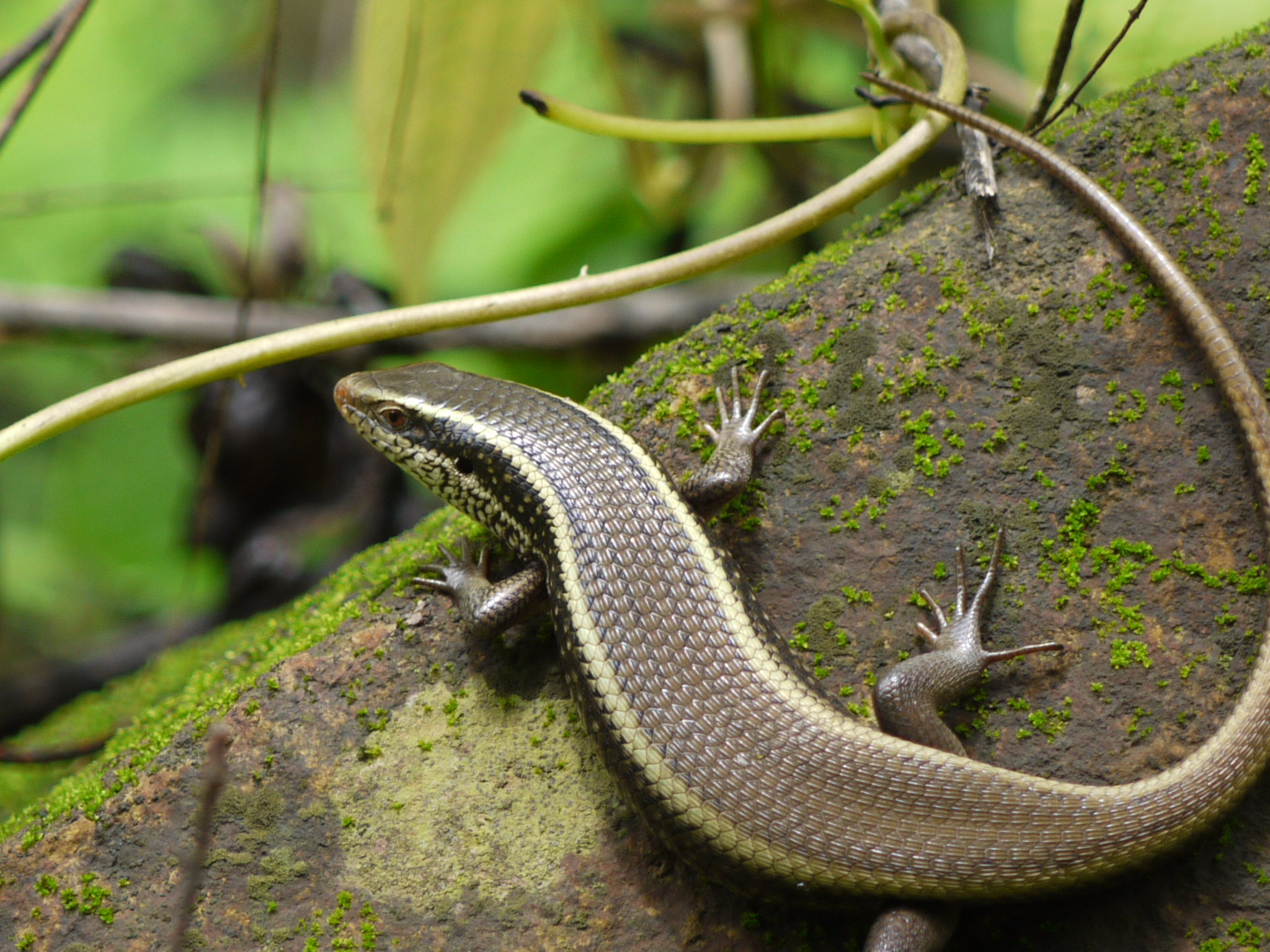
Eutropis carinata

Body robust; snout moderate, obtuse. Lower eyelids scaly; vertebral scales smooth. Ear-opening roundish, sub-triangular. Brown to olive or bronze in color above, uniform or with dark-brown or black spots, or longitudinal streaks along the lateral margins of the scales. Sides are dark-brown or chestnut, with or without light spots. A light dorso-lateral line starting from above the eye and continued to the base of the tail. Lower parts whitish or yellowish. Maximum length: 37 cm. and Common length: 25, in which Snout-vent length is 9 cm.

The Sri Lankan lankae is now treated as a full species, Eutropis lankae.

== Distribution ==
Frequently found in Bangladesh, India (except in the North-West), Maldives, Myanmar, & Nepal and Possibly in Bhutan.

== Ecology ==
=== Habitat ===
Diurnal, and terrestrial, frequently seen basking or foraging in open areas.

=== Diet ===
Crickets, caterpillars, beetles, and earthworms and even small vertebrates are known to be consumed.

=== Reproduction ===
Oviparous; clutches of 2-20 eggs are laid at a time in a self-excavated hole or under fallen logs, between August and September. Eggs are measuring 11 * 17 mm. Hatchlings emerge between May and June, measure 12–12.5 mm. The male reproductive cycle in Mysore, (southern India), is characterized by peak testicular size and maximum spermatogenic activity and steroidogenic activity during Oct-November which coincides with the female reproductive cycle generally in the dry, post- rainy season of the year.
