= Eutropis caraga =

Conservation status
- Least Concern (IUCN 3.1)

Scientific classification
- Kingdom: Animalia
- Phylum: Chordata
- Class: Reptilia
- Order: Squamata
- Family: Scincidae
- Genus: Eutropis
- Species: E. caraga

Binomial name
- Eutropis caraga Barley, Diesmos, Siler, Martinez, & Brown, 2020

Species of lizard

Eutropis caraga, the Caraga sun skink, is a species of skink found in the Philippines.
