= Eutropis resetarii =

Scientific classification
- Kingdom: Animalia
- Phylum: Chordata
- Class: Reptilia
- Order: Squamata
- Family: Scincidae
- Genus: Eutropis
- Species: E. resetarii

Binomial name
- Eutropis resetarii Batuwita, Udugampala & Edirisinghe, 2020

Species of lizard

Eutropis resetarii is a species of skink, a lizard in the family Scincidae. The species is endemic to Sri Lanka.

== Etymology ==
The specific name, resetarii, is in honor of American herpetologist Alan Resetar.

== Reproduction ==
The mode of reproduction of E. resetarii is unknown.
