= Eutropis greeri =

Conservation status
- Data Deficient (IUCN 3.1)

Scientific classification
- Kingdom: Animalia
- Phylum: Chordata
- Class: Reptilia
- Order: Squamata
- Family: Scincidae
- Genus: Eutropis
- Species: E. greeri

Binomial name
- Eutropis greeri Batuwita, 2016

Species of lizard

Eutropis greeri is a species of skink, a lizard in the family Scincidae. The species is endemic to Sri Lanka.

== Etymology ==
The specific name, greeri, is in honor of Australian herpetologist Allen E. Greer.

== Geographic range ==
E. greeri is found in Galle District, Southern Province, Sri Lanka.

== Habitat ==
The preferred natural habitat of E. greeri is rainforest, at altitudes of 30–500 m (98–1,640 ft).

== Behavior ==
E. greeri is terrestrial, living in the leaf litter of the rainforest.

== Reproduction ==
The mode of reproduction of E. greeri is unknown.
