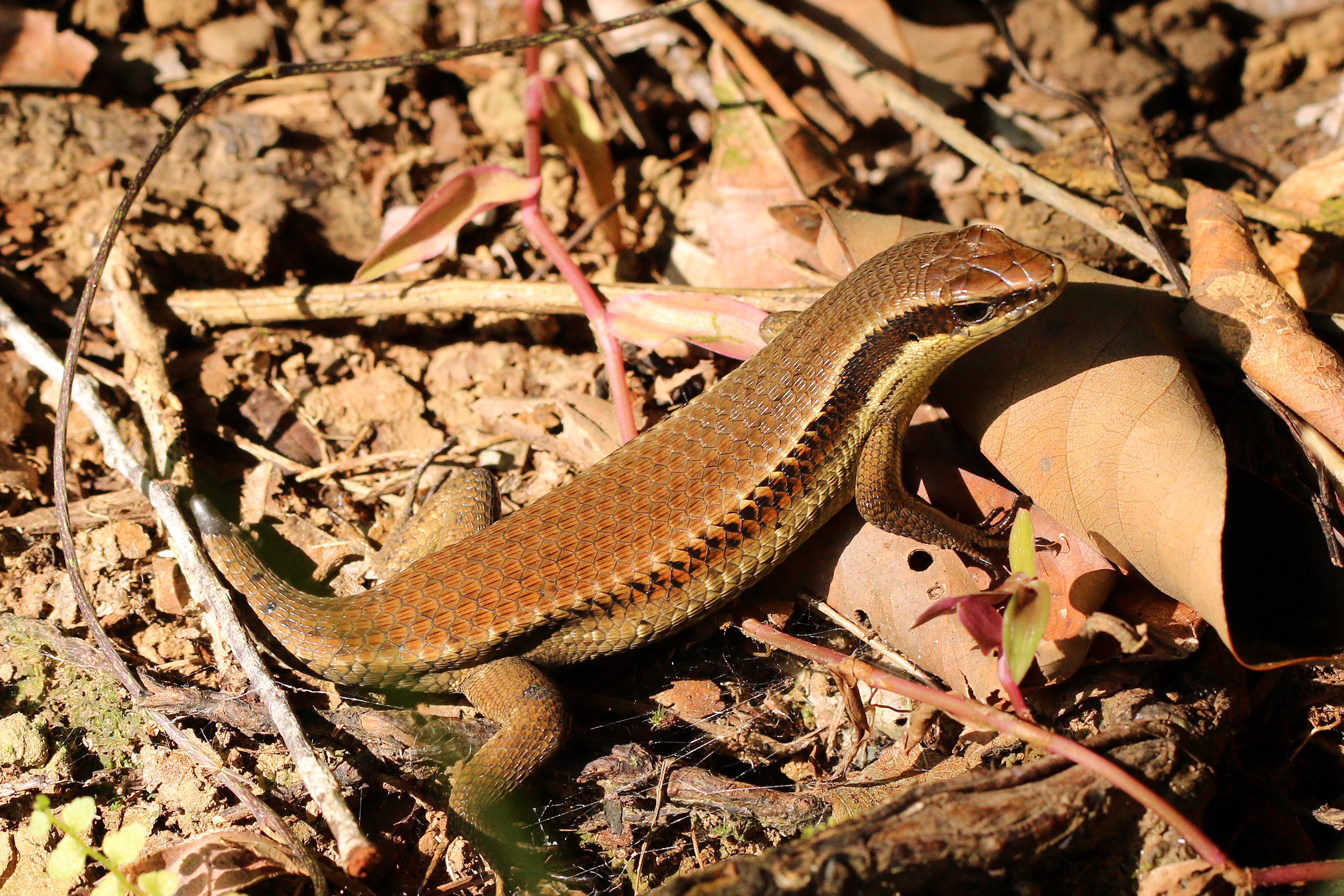
- In Danum Valley Conservation Area, Sabah, Borneo, Malaysia

Conservation status
- Least Concern (IUCN 3.1)

Scientific classification
- Kingdom: Animalia
- Phylum: Chordata
- Class: Reptilia
- Order: Squamata
- Family: Scincidae
- Genus: Eutropis
- Species: E. multifasciata

Binomial name
- Eutropis multifasciata (Kuhl, 1820)

Synonyms
- Mabuya multifasciata Fitzinger, 1826; Scincus multifasciatus Kuhl, 1820

= Eutropis multifasciata =

Species of lizard

Eutropis multifasciata, commonly known as the East Indian brown mabuya, many-lined sun skink, many-striped skink, common sun skink or (ambiguously) as golden skink, is a species of skink that inhabits an extensive range from India and southern China to southern Indonesia.

== Description ==
See Snake scales for terminology.

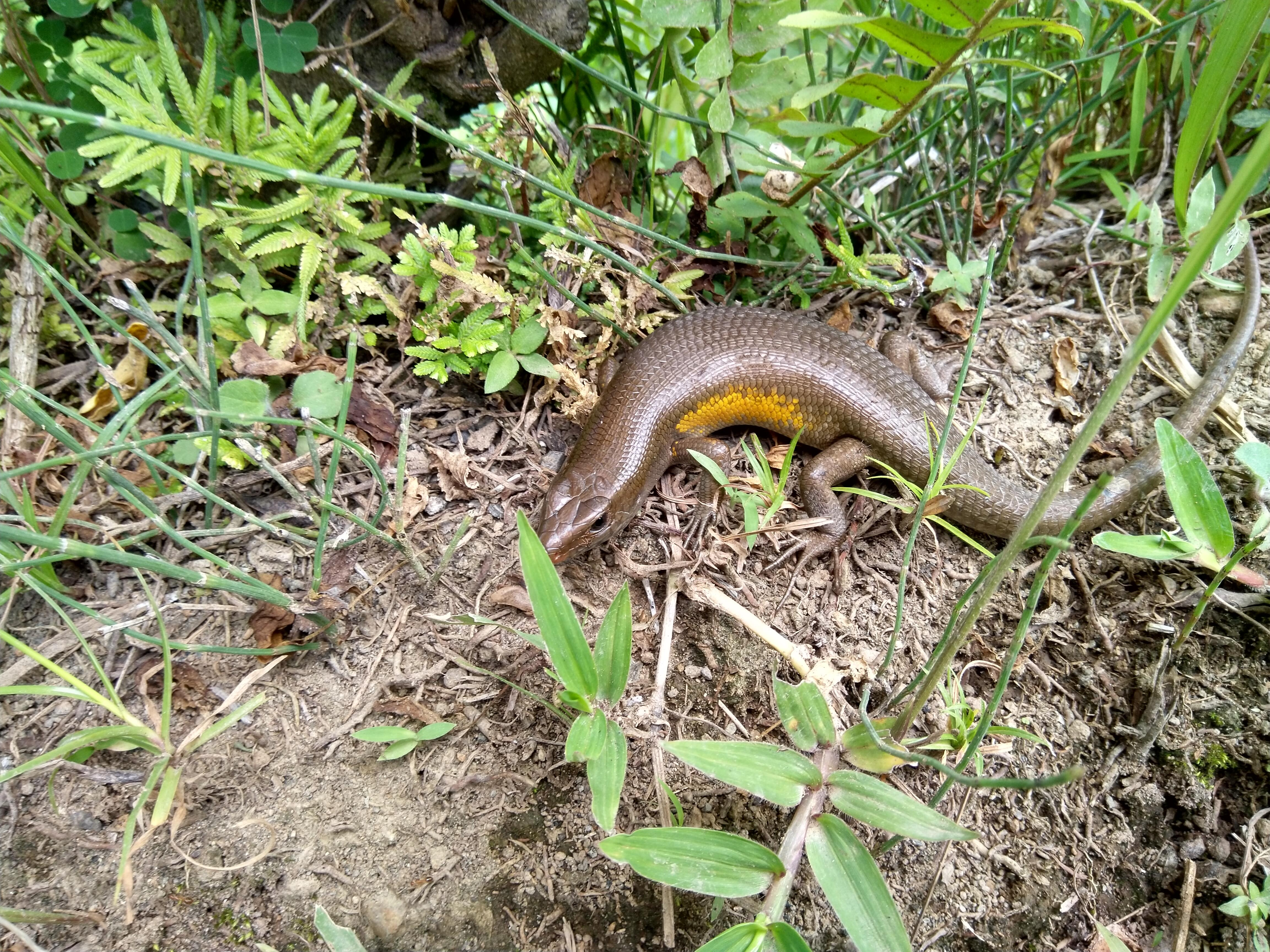
A many-striped skink in Bali, Indonesia

Eutropis multifasciata is a species of skink that often shows prominent coloured dorsal bands. They have a number of other distinctive features that allows this species to be distinguished from other species, particularly in the detail of the arrangement of their scales. Their snout is moderate to obtuse, and their lower eyelid is scaly. The nostril is positioned behind the vertical line of the suture between the rostral and first labial scale, and it has a postnasal scale. The anterior loreal scale is no deeper than the second, and is in contact with the first labial scale. The supranasal scales are largely in contact behind the rostral. The frontonasal scale is broader than it is long, and the prefrontal scales consistently form a median suture. The frontal scale is as long as or shorter than the frontoparietals and interparietal together, and makes contact with the second (and occasionally the first) supraocular. There are four supraoculars, the second of which is largest, and six supraciliaries, the first of which is largest. There are distinct fronto-parietal scales, larger than the interparietal, completely separating the parietals. There are a pair of nuchals and four labials anterior to the subocular, which is large and not narrower below. The ear-opening is roundish or oval and is as large as a lateral scale, or a little smaller. The dorsal scales are more or less distinctly tricarinate, with three or rarely five ridges. The nuchal and lateral scales are usually very feebly keeled or sometimes smooth. There are 30 to 34 scales around the middle of the body, and the dorsals are largest. The hind limb reaches the wrist or the elbow of the forelimb. The subdigital lamellae are smooth. The scales on the upper surface of the tibia are mostly tricarinate. The tail is 1.3 to 1.6 times the length of the head and body. They are brown or olive above; some specimens are uniformly coloured, while others have a large whitish/red patch on either side of their bodies. Their backs have small black spots, sometimes merging into longitudinal lines. The sides are usually dark brown, with whitish, black-edged ocelli. A well-defined light dorso-lateral band is very occasionally present, and the lower surfaces are yellowish or greenish white.

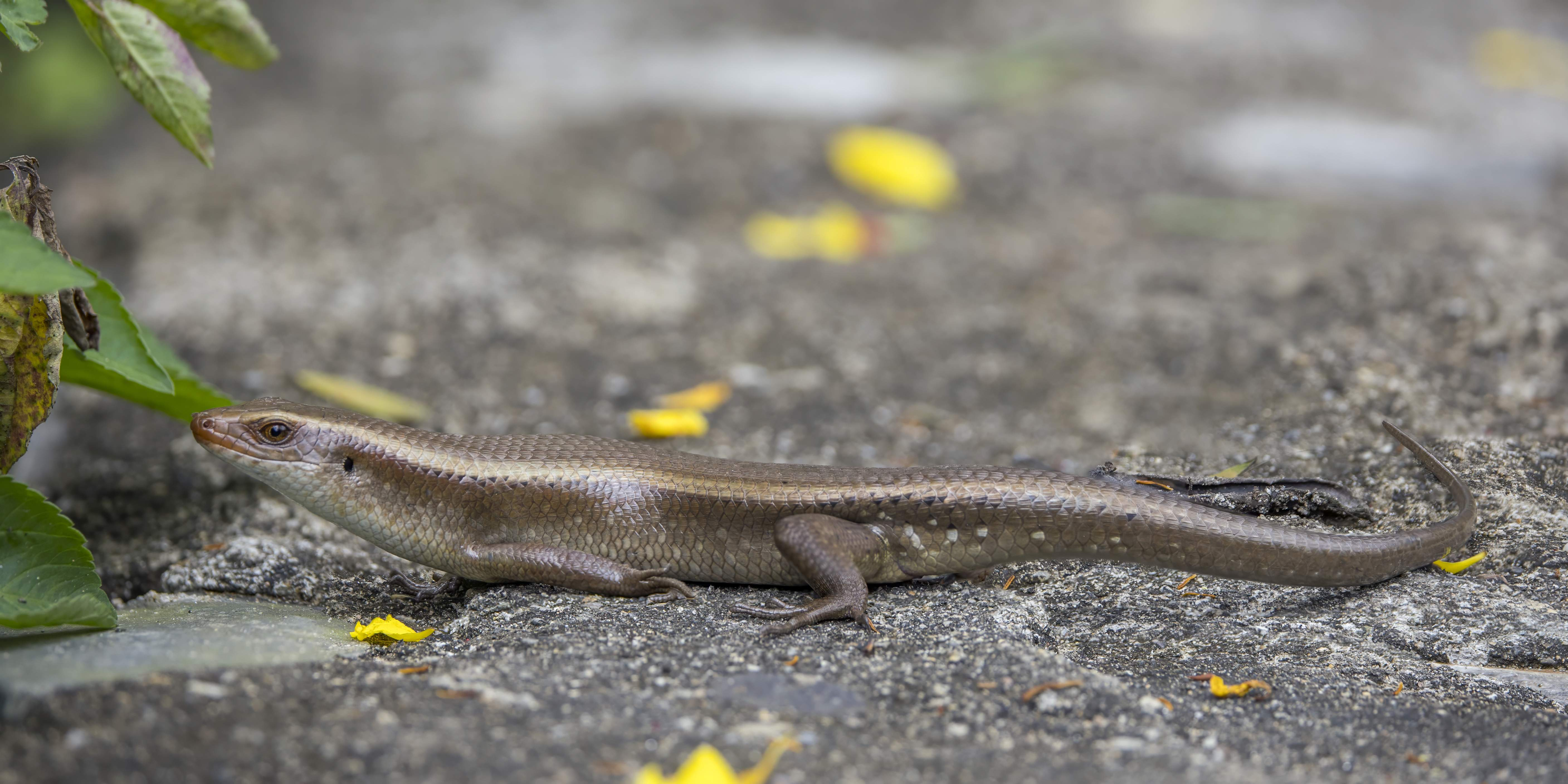
male

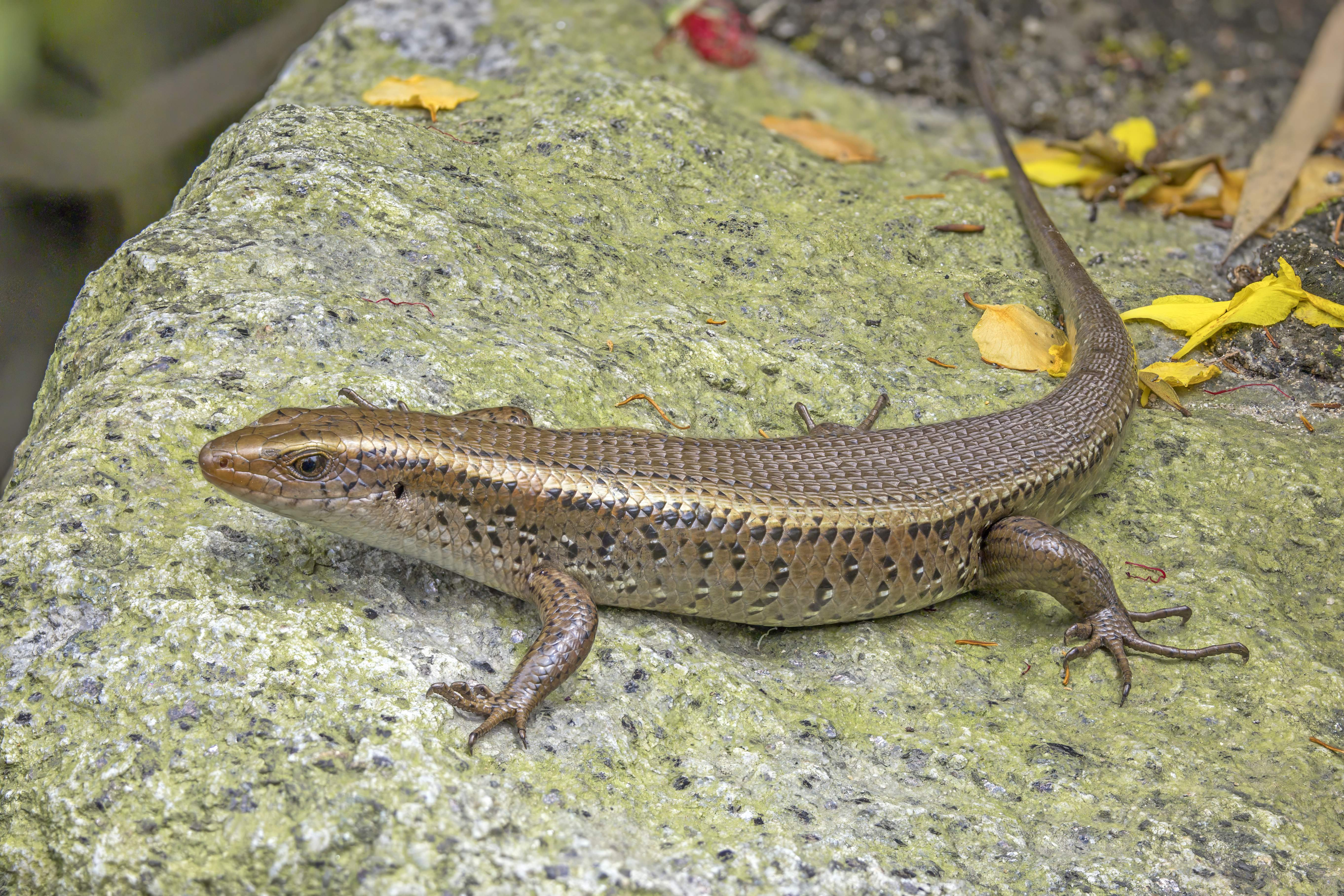
female

== Distribution ==
The species is widely present in southern Asia and occurs from India (Assam and the Nicobar islands) and southern China throughout continental Southeast Asia to southern Indonesia, with scattered records from New Guinea. It has been introduced to Australia and the USA.

=== Mating Ritual ===
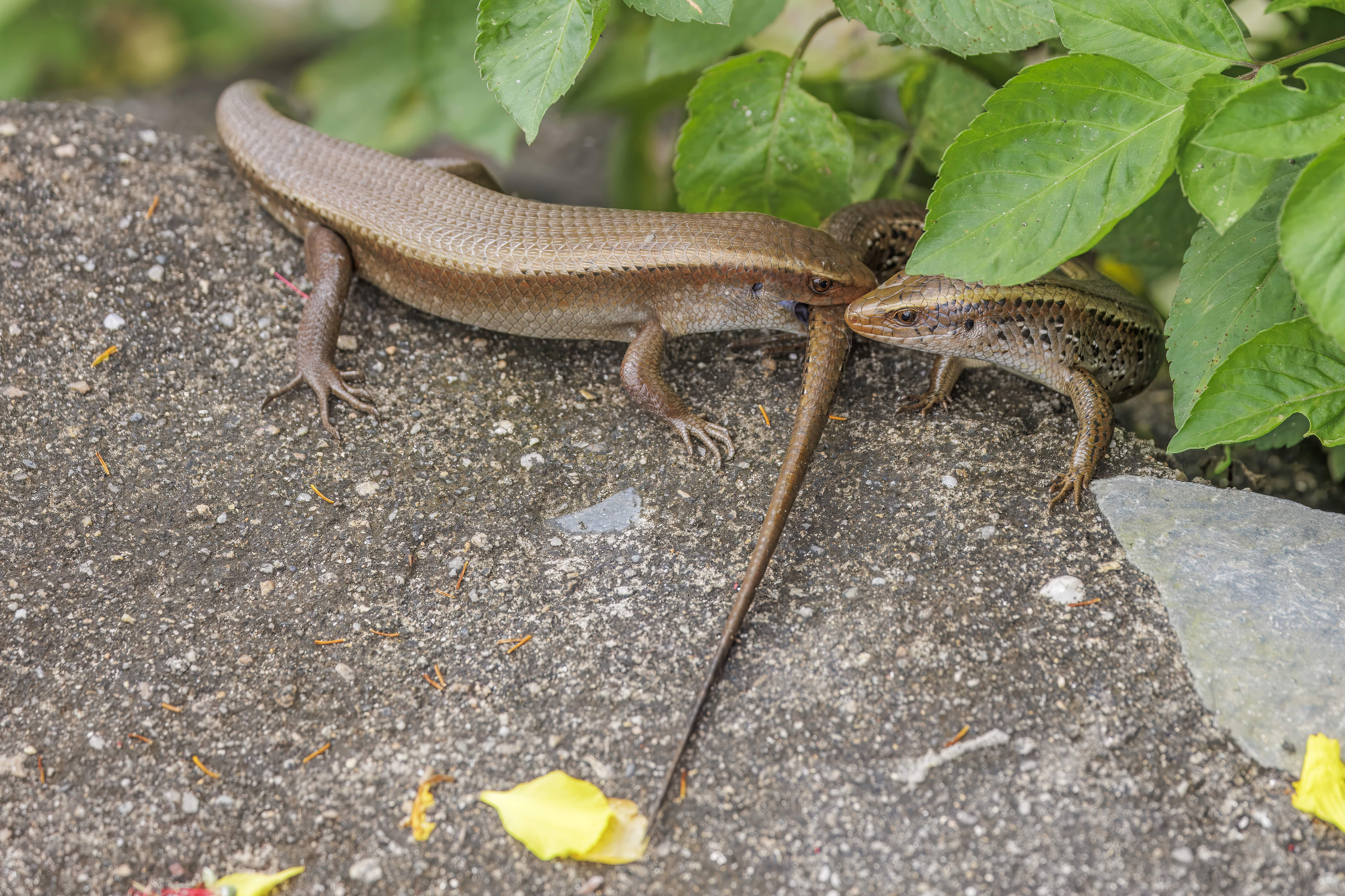
male bite hold

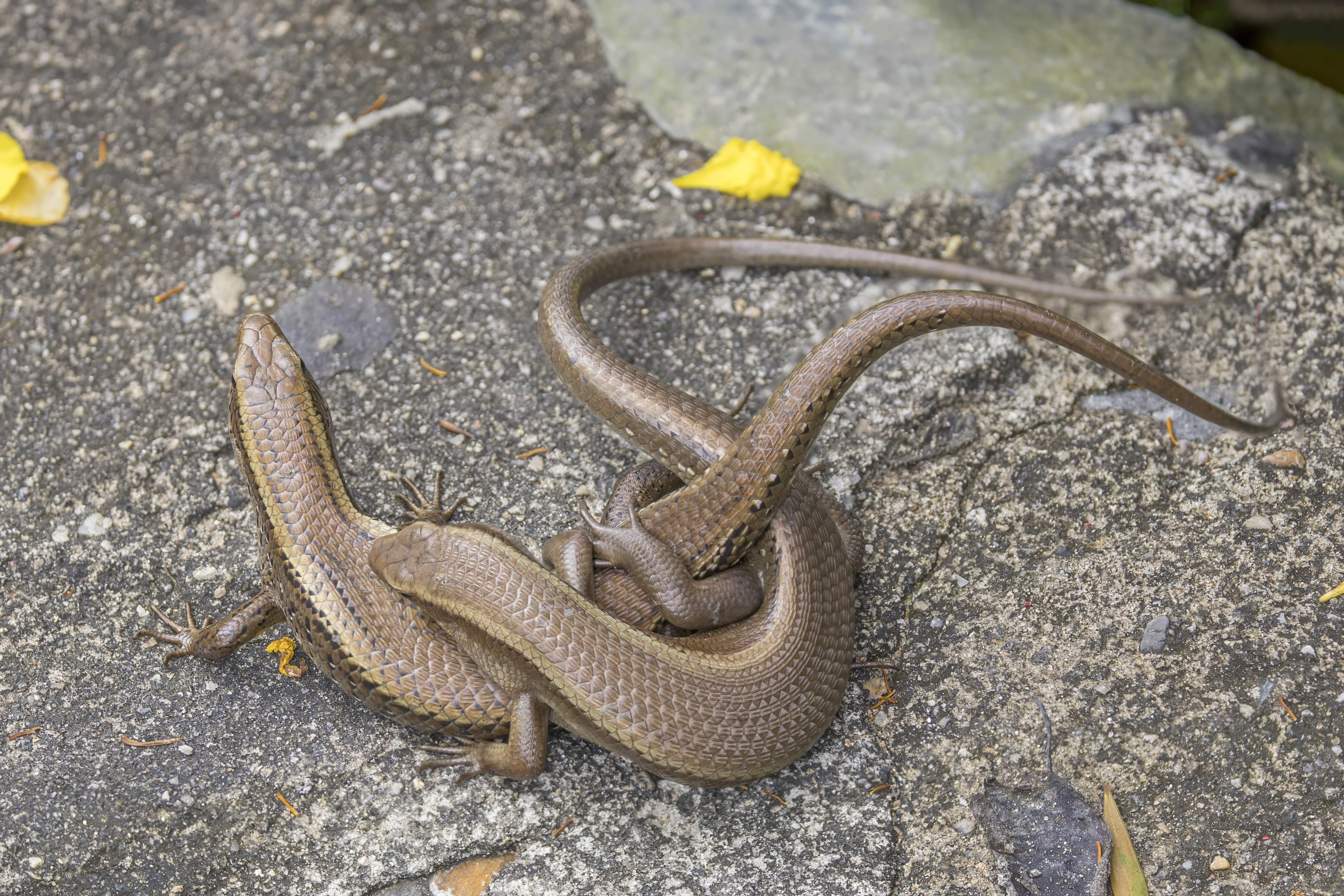

=== Invasive species ===
==== Taiwan ====
Eutropis multifasciata was first observed in Taiwan in 1992, in the southern Kaohsiung area. It has since spread northward and established populations in the central-western and south-western lowlands. The species has successfully adapted to Taiwan's agricultural areas, open forests, and human-disturbed areas. Its high fecundity (reproductive ability) has enabled it to compete with other species for resources. This is likely the cause of the decline in the populations of indigenous lizard species that occupy the same habitats as Eutropis multifasciata. Since this species has a poor cold tolerance, its elevational distribution in Taiwan is restricted below 500 meters. However, it is expected that in response to rising temperatures associated with climate change, this species will benefit from increased maximum activity time. As a result, distribution of this species is expected to expand from lowland areas to higher elevations, especially if the landscape becomes more open.
