= Eutropis beddomei =

Conservation status
- Least Concern (IUCN 3.1)

Scientific classification
- Kingdom: Animalia
- Phylum: Chordata
- Class: Reptilia
- Order: Squamata
- Family: Scincidae
- Genus: Eutropis
- Species: E. beddomei

Binomial name
- Eutropis beddomei (Jerdon, 1870)

Synonyms
- Euprepes beddomei Jerdon, 1870; Euprepes (Tiliqua) septemlineatus Blanford, 1870; Mabuia beddomii — Boulenger, 1887; Mabuya beddomii — M.A. Smith, 1935; Eutropis beddomii — Mausfeld et al., 2002; Eutropis beddomei — Venugopal, 2010

Species of lizard

Eutropis beddomei, commonly known as Beddome's mabuya or Beddome's skink, is a species of lizard in the family Scincidae. The species is native to India and Sri Lanka.

== Etymology ==
E. beddomei is named after Richard Henry Beddome, 1830-1911, British army officer and botanist.

== Description ==
Boulenger (1890) described E. beddomei as follows:

"Snout short, obtuse. Lower eyelid scaly. Nostril behind vertical of suture between rostral and first labial; no postnasal; anterior loreal deeper and shorter than the second, in contact with the first labial; supranasals in contact behind the rostral; frontonasal broader than long, sometimes in contact with the frontal; the latter usually as long as, or a little shorter than, the frontoparietals and interparietal together, sometimes not longer than the frontoparietals, in contact with the second, or rarely first and second, supraoculars; 4 supraoculars, second largest; 6 supraciliaries, first longest; frontoparietals distinct, as long as or longer than the interparietal, which usually entirely separates the parietals; a pair of nuchals; 4 labials anterior to the subocular, which is large and not narrower below. Ear-opening oval, as large as a lateral scale, or a little smaller, with three short pointed lobules anteriorly. Dorsal and nuchal scales with 3 or 5 keels, sometimes very feeble; 30 to 32 scales round the middle of the body, subequal. The adpressed limbs meet or slightly overlap, Subdigital lamellae unicarinate. Scales on upper surface of tibia mostly tricarinate. Tail 1.6 to 2.2 times the length of head and body. The coloration varies considerably, but a lateral black band, edged above and below with a whitish streak, is constant. Some (young) specimens black above, with seven light longitudinal lines; others olive-brown with four black dorsal streaks, which may not extend further back than the nape; or a light black-edged vertebral band may be present; head-shields spotted or variegated with black; limbs and tail rufous; lower surfaces white."

"From snout to vent 2.2 in (5.6 cm); tail 4.75 in (12.1 cm)."

== Geographic range ==
Eutropis beddomei is found in southern India (Salem, Tinnevelly, Malabar, Mysore, etc.), the most northern locality known being southeastern Berar. It is also found in Sri Lanka.

The type locality is "Mysore".
