= Eutropis innotata =

Conservation status
- Data Deficient (IUCN 3.1)

Scientific classification
- Kingdom: Animalia
- Phylum: Chordata
- Class: Reptilia
- Order: Squamata
- Family: Scincidae
- Genus: Eutropis
- Species: E. innotata

Binomial name
- Eutropis innotata (Blanford, 1870)

Synonyms
- Euprepes innotata Blanford, 1870; Mabuya innotata (Blanford, 1870)

Species of lizard

Blanford's mabuya (Eutropis innotata) ( is a species of skink found in peninsular India.

== Description ==
Snout short, obtuse. Lower eyelid with an undivided transparent disk. Nostril pierced behind the vertical of the suture between the rostral and the first labial; no postnasal; anterior loreal in contact with the first labial; frontonasal broader than long, in contact with the rostral and (not constantly) with the frontal; latter a little shorter than the frontoparietals and interparietal together, in contact with the second supraocular only; 4 supraoculars, second very large; 6 supracilianes; frontoparietals distinct, slightly shorter than the interparietal, which entirely separates the parietals; a pair of nuchals; 4 labials anterior to the subocular, which is at least twice as long as the neighbouring labials, and not narrower below. Bar-opening triangular, a little larger than a lateral scale, with three or four short lobules anteriorly. Nuchal and lateral scales mostly feebly tricarinate; dorsals quinquecarinate; 34 (or 32) scales round the middle of the body. The hind limb reaches the wrist of the adpressed fore limb. Subdigital lamella smooth. Tail about 1.75 times length of head and body. Bronzy olive above, aides dark brown; a light, black-edged streak on each side, from the prefrontal and along the supraciliaries to the anterior third of the back, where it gradually disappears; a light streak from below the eye to the shoulder; lower surfaces whitish. From snout to vent 2.2 inches; tail 3.75. Penganga Valley, S.E. Berar.

== Distribution ==
Southern and central India.
