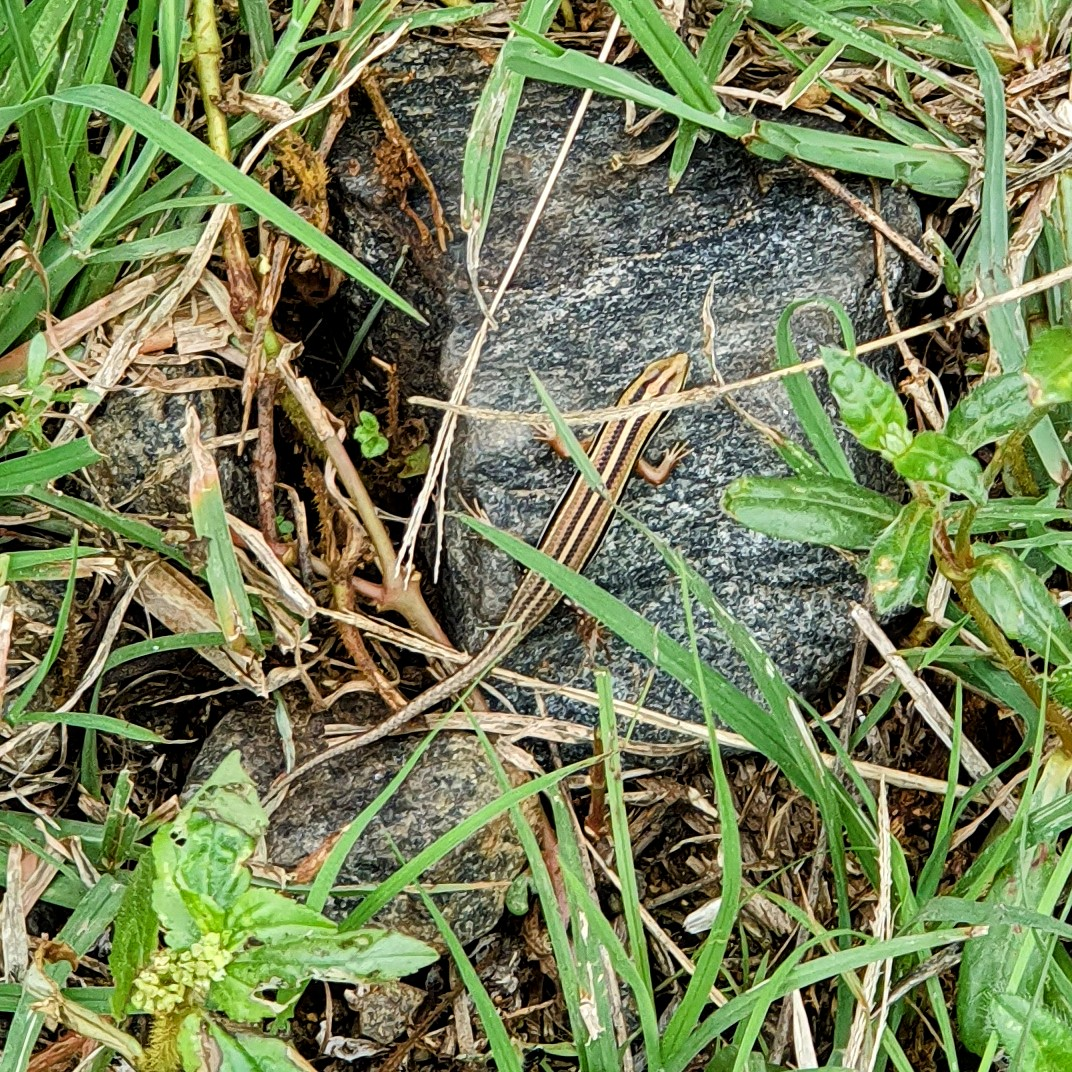

Conservation status
- Near Threatened (IUCN 3.1)

Scientific classification
- Kingdom: Animalia
- Phylum: Chordata
- Class: Reptilia
- Order: Squamata
- Family: Scincidae
- Genus: Eutropis
- Species: E. bibronii

Binomial name
- Eutropis bibronii (Gray, 1838)
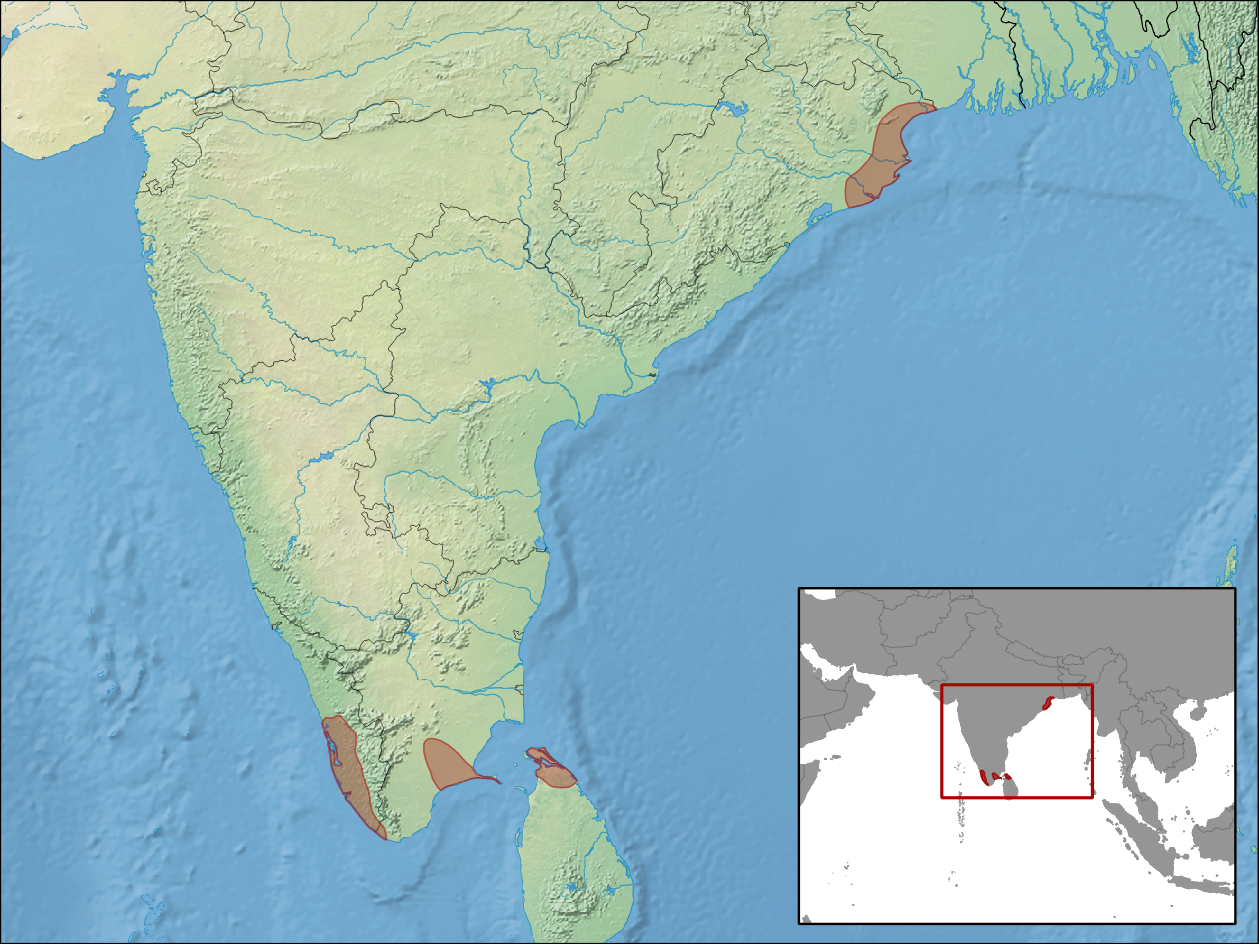

Synonyms
- Tiliqua bibronii Gray, 1838; Mabuia bibronii — Boulenger, 1890; Mabuya bibronii — Das, 1996; Eutropis bibronii — Mausfeld et al., 2002

= Eutropis bibronii =

Species of lizard

Eutropis bibronii, also known commonly as Bibron's mabuya, Bibron's skink, and the seashore skink, is a species of lizard in the family Scincidae. The species is native to India and Sri Lanka.

== Etymology ==
The specific name, bibronii, is in honor of French herpetologist Gabriel Bibron (1806–1848).

== Description ==
The head of E. bibronii is somewhat flattened. The lower eyelid has a transparent disk. The scales on the dorsum and flanks are sharp, numbering 5–7. The scale rows at midbody number 28–30. There are 14–20 lamellae under the fourth toe. The dorsum is olive brown, with a light vertebral stripe which is dark-edged. A dark dorso-lateral stripe runs from the eye to the base of the tail.

== Ecology ==
E. bibronii occurs is a fossorial species that has been observed burrowing in low vegetation on sand dunes. It is typically a coastal lowland (less than 20 m (66 ft) above sea level) species, but there are unconfirmed records from further inland as high as 490 m (1,610 ft) asl.

== Reproduction ==
The mode of reproduction of E. bibronii is unknown.
