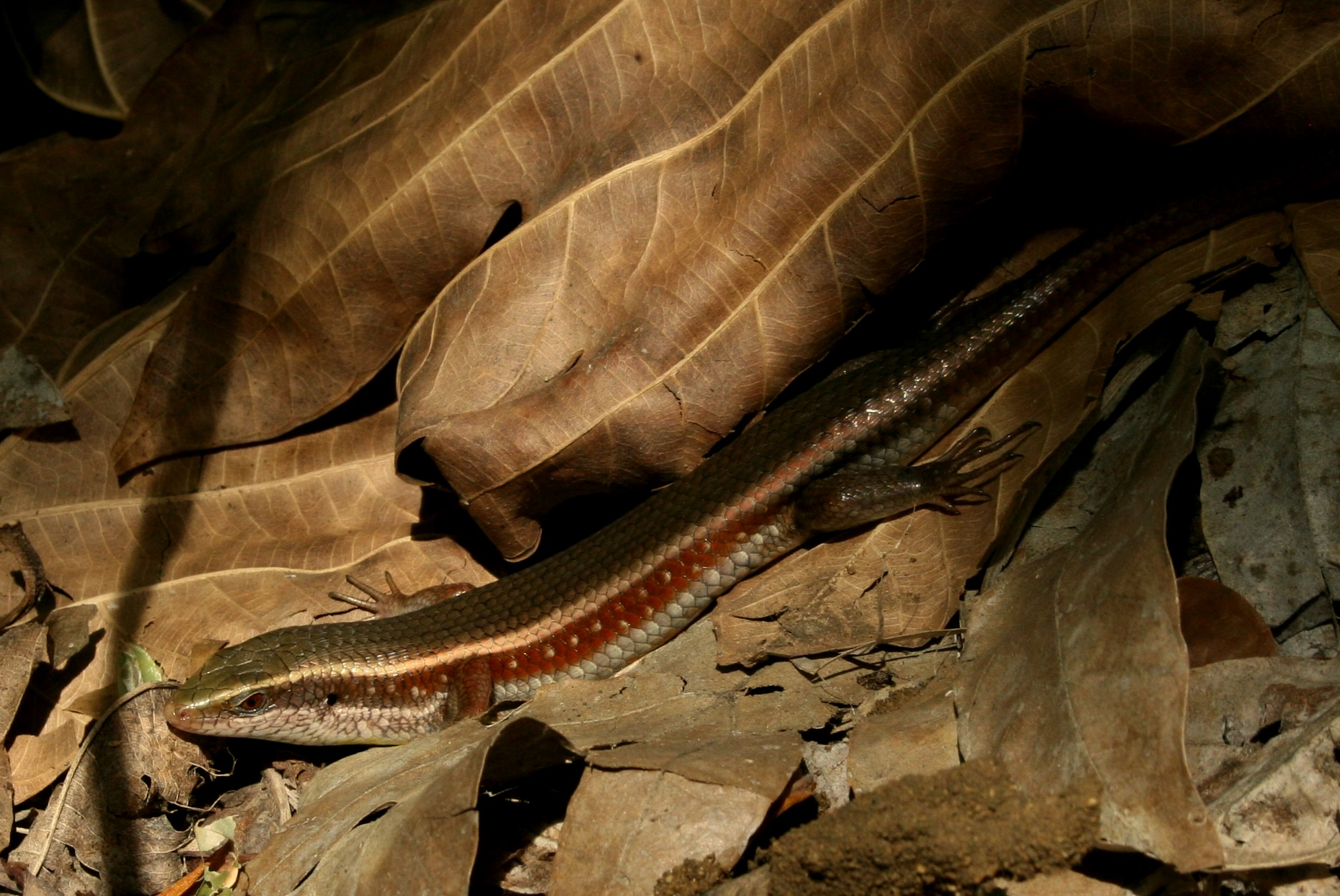

Scientific classification
- Kingdom: Animalia
- Phylum: Chordata
- Order: Squamata
- Family: Scincidae
- Genus: Eutropis
- Species: E. lankae

Binomial name
- Eutropis lankae Deraniyagala, 1953

= Eutropis lankae =

Species of lizard

Eutropis lankae is a species of skink found in Sri Lanka.
