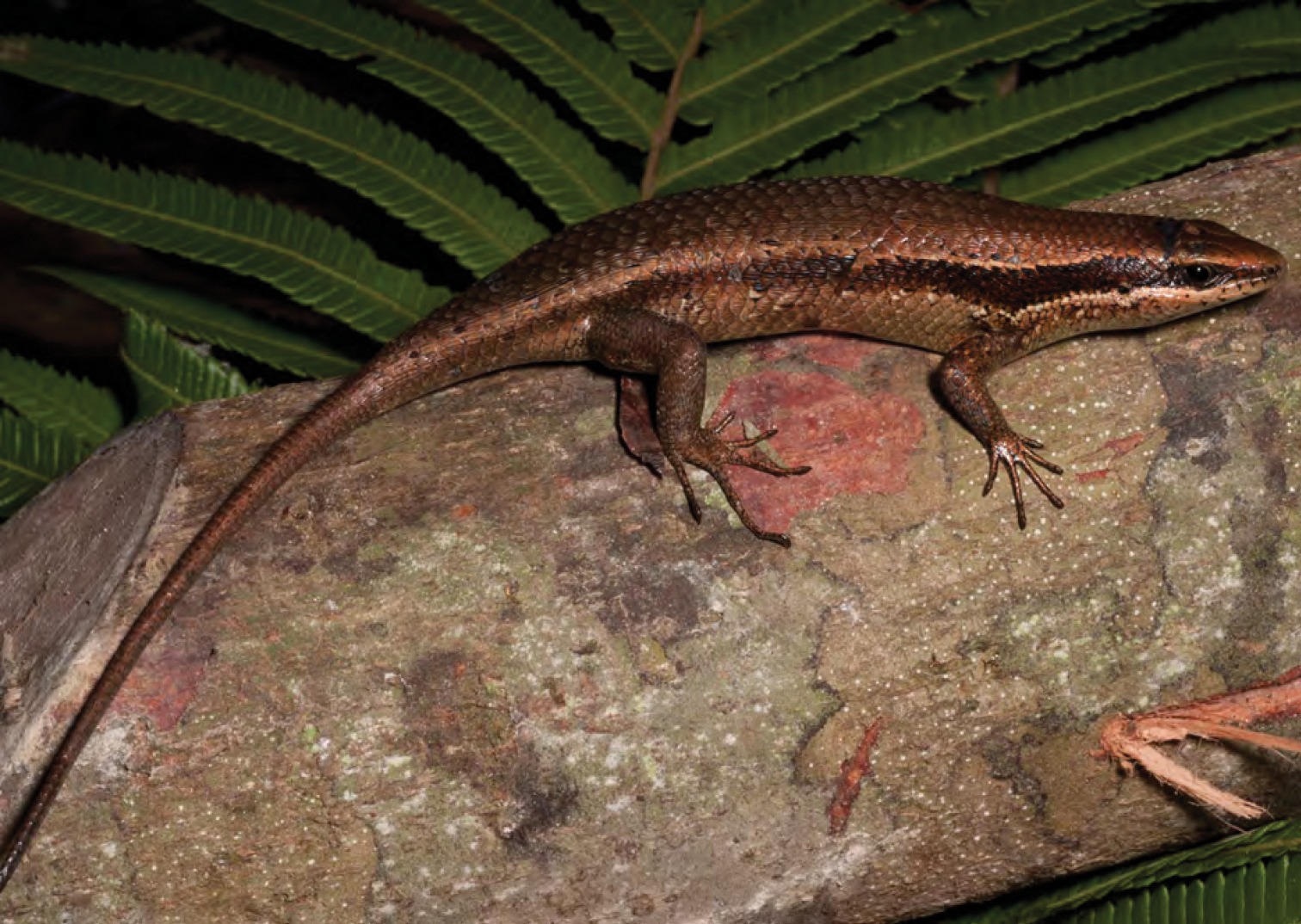

Conservation status
- Least Concern (IUCN 3.1)

Scientific classification
- Kingdom: Animalia
- Phylum: Chordata
- Class: Reptilia
- Order: Squamata
- Family: Scincidae
- Genus: Eutropis
- Species: E. multicarinata

Binomial name
- Eutropis multicarinata (Gray, 1845)

= Eutropis multicarinata =

Species of lizard

Eutropis multicarinata is a species of skink found in Indonesia and the Philippines.
