= List of amphibians and reptiles of Cebu =

The island of Cebu in the Philippines is home to various species of reptiles and amphibians. Supsup, et al. (2016) recorded a total of 13 amphibian species and 63 reptile species.

Brachymeles cebuensis is a rare skink endemic to Cebu. Secretive blind snakes such as Malayotyphlops hypogius and Ramphotyhlops cumingii are found on the island as well. Other endemic species in Cebu include the Cebu Flowerpecker (Diceaum quadricolor), Cebu Slender Skink (Brachymeles cebuensis), Cebu Cinnamon tree (Cinnamomum cebuense), and Black Shama (Copsychus cebuensis).

== Amphibians ==
Bufonidae

- Rhinella marina

Ceratobatrachidae

- Platymantis dorsalis
- Platymantis corrugatus

Dicroglossidae

- Fejervarya moodiei
- Fejervarya vittigera
- Limnonectes leytensis
- Limnonectes visayanus
- Occidozyga laevis

Microhylidae

- Kaloula conjuncta negrosensis
- Kaloula picta
- Kaloula pulchra

Ranidae

- Hylarana erythraea

Rhacophoridae

- Polypedates leucomystax

== Reptiles ==
=== Turtles ===
Bataguridae

- Cuora amboinensis amboinensis
- Pelodiscus sinensis

=== Crocodiles ===
Crocodylidae

- Crocodylus porosus

=== Lizards ===
Agamidae

- Bronchocela cf. cristatella
- Draco spilopterus
- Gonocephalus sophiae
- Hydrosaurus pustulatus

Dibamidae

- Dibamus novaeguineae

Gekkonidae

- Cyrtodactylus annulatus
- Cyrtodactylus philippinicus
- Gehyra mutilata
- Gekko gecko
- Gekko mindorensis
- Hemidactylus frenatus
- Hemidactylus platyurus
- Hemidactylus stejnegeri
- Hemiphyllodactylus insularis
- Hemiphyllodactylus cf. typus
- Lepidodactylus aureolineatus
- Lepidodactylus herrei medianus
- Lepidodactylus lugubris
- Lepidodactylus planicauda
- Pseudogekko atiorum

Scincidae

- Brachymeles taylori
- Brachymeles cebuensis — endemic
- Brachymeles gracilis
- Emoia atrocostata
- Eutropis cf. indeprensa
- Eutropis multicarinata borealis
- Eutropis multifasciata
- Lamprolepis smaragdina philippinica
- Lipinia auriculata
- Lipinia quadrivittata
- Parvoscincus steerei
- Pinoyscincus jagori grandis
- Tropidophorus grayi

Varanidae

- Varanus nuchalis

=== Snakes ===
Acrochordidae

- Acrochordus granulatus

Colubridae

- Ahaetulla prasina preocularis
- Calamaria gervaisi
- Chrysopelea paradisi
- Coelognathus erythrurus psephenoura
- Cyclocorus lineatus alcalai
- Dendrelaphis philippinensis
- Dendrelaphis marenae
- Lycodon capucinus
- Psammodynastes pulverulentus
- Pseudorabdion mcnamarae
- Pseudorabdion oxycephalum

Elapidae

- Hemibungarus gemianulis
- Hydrophis cyanocinctus
- Laticauda colubrina
- Laticauda laticaudata
- Ophiophagus hannah

Gerrhopilidae

- Gerrhopilus hedraeus

Homalopsidae

- Cerberus schneiderii

Lamprophiidae

- Oxyrhabdium leporinum visayanum

Natricidae

- Tropidonophis negrosensis

Pythonidae

- Malayopython reticulatus

Typhlopidae

- Malayotyphlops hypogius
- Malayotyphlops luzonensis
- Malayotyphlops ruber
- Ramphotyphlops braminus
- Ramphotyphlops cumingii

== See also ==
- Wildlife of the Philippines
