= Southern Philippine false gecko =

Conservation status
- Least Concern (IUCN 3.1)

Scientific classification
- Kingdom: Animalia
- Phylum: Chordata
- Class: Reptilia
- Order: Squamata
- Suborder: Gekkota
- Family: Gekkonidae
- Genus: Pseudogekko
- Species: P. pungkaypinit

Binomial name
- Pseudogekko pungkaypinit Siler, Welton, Davis, Watters, Davey, Diesmos, Diesmos, & Brown, 2014

Species of reptile

The southern Philippine false gecko (Pseudogekko pungkaypinit) is a species of gecko. It is endemic to the Philippines.

== Taxonomy ==
Luperosaurus compresicorpus, the Philippine false gecko, was discovered by herpetologist Edward Harrison Taylor in 1915. In 1922, Taylor moved this species to the genus Pseudogekko. In 2014, Pseudogekko compresicorpus was split into three additional species, Pseudogekko chavacano, Pseudogekko ditoy, and Pseudogekko pungkaypinit.

The type locality of Pseudogekko pungkaypinit is Calbiga, a creek area on the Visayas State University Visca Campus in Baybay City, Leyte, Philippines.

== Etymology ==
The specific name, pungkaypinit, comes from the Waray terms "pungkay" (treetop) and "pinit" (lizard).
