= Hoop snake =

Mythological creature

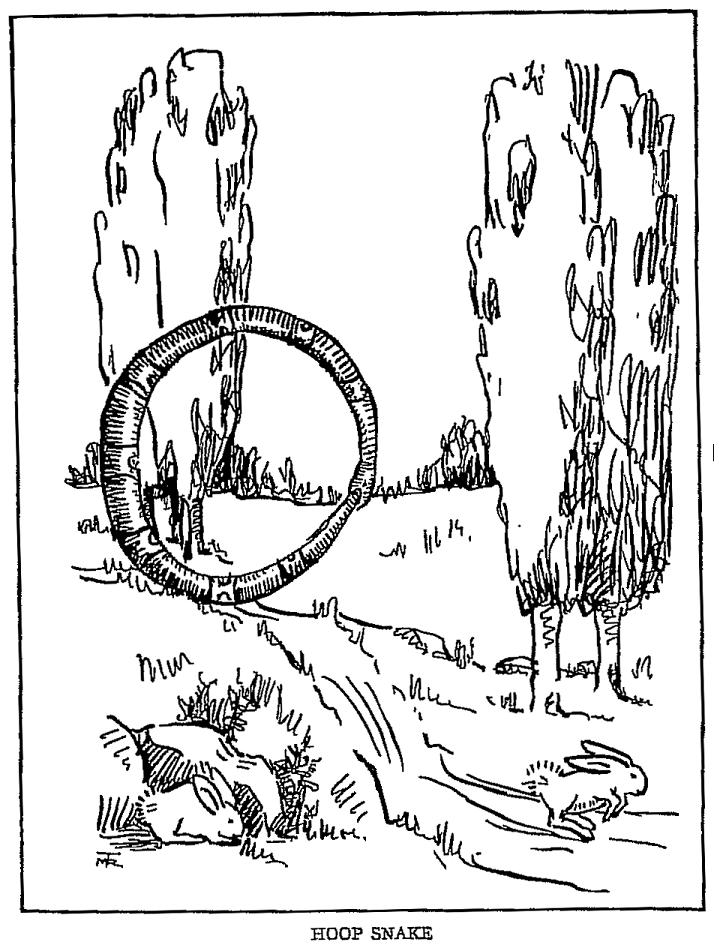

The hoop snake is a legendary creature of the United States, Canada, and Australia. Although the description of hoop snakes found in the Pecos Bill stories is the general concept with which people are most familiar, stories of the creature predate those fictional tales considerably.

== In folklore ==
According to folklore, the distinguishing feature of a hoop snake is that it can grasp its tail in its jaws, like the ouroboros of Greek mythology, and roll after its prey like a wheel. In one version of the myth, the snake straightens out at the last second, skewering its victim with its venomous tail. The only escape is to hide behind a tree, which receives the deadly blow instead and promptly dies from the venom.

An Australian rendition of the myth describes a circular-shaped snake roughly the size of a steering wheel with a set of elongated spines evenly spaced along the inner lining of its annular form. It is hypothesised that the snake has the ability to rapidly constrict, quickly reducing the circumference of its body to entrap the limb of a kangaroo, wallaby, dingo, or human.

The hoop snake is mentioned in a letter from 1784 (published in Tour in the U.S.A., Vol. I, p. 263-65. London):

As other serpents crawl upon their bellies, so can this; but he has another method of moving peculiar to his own species, which he always adopts when he is in eager pursuit of his prey; he throws himself into a circle, running rapidly around, advancing like a hoop, with his tail arising and pointed forward in the circle, by which he is always in the ready position of striking.

It is observed that they only make use of this method in attacking; for when they flee from their enemy they go upon their bellies, like other serpents.

From the above circumstance, peculiar to themselves, they have also derived the appellation of hoop snakes.

The creatures made their way into African-American traditions. Liddie Aiken, the daughter of a former slave, recounted how her mother feared hoop-snakes, which were said to be able to kill anything their horn or tail touched.

== Sightings ==
Hoop snakes appear in the folklore of various parts of the United States, including Virginia and West Virginia. Several sightings of the hoop snake have been alleged along the Minnesota–Wisconsin border in the St. Croix River valley (recently Hudson, Wisconsin), the counties of Wake and Watauga in North Carolina, Prince Edward Island, and Kamloops, British Columbia.

Despite occasional reports, the existence of the hoop snake has never been accepted by the scientific community. Naturalist Raymond Ditmars placed $10,000 in trust at a New York bank for the first person to provide evidence of a hoop snake. Some have suggested it is a distorted description of the sidewinder of the American Southwest, or of the red-bellied mudsnake, which possesses a scale at the end of its tail that has been mistaken for a stinger and which occasionally positions itself in a loose hoop shape. The hoop snake possibly is an embellishment of actual instances of snakes swallowing their own tails, mistaking them for prey.

The dwarf reed snake (Pseudorabdion longiceps) of Southeast Asia has been filmed "cartwheeling" as an escape mechanism, superficially similar to the behavior described for the hoop snake. The Malayan spinejaw snake has also been observed cartwheeling.

== See also ==
- Amphisbaena
- Fearsome critters
- Joint snake
- Ouroboros
- Rotating locomotion in living systems
- Serpent (symbolism)
- Snow snake
- Tsuchinoko
