= Snow snake (folklore) =

Mythical creature from American folklore

In American folklore, the snow snake is a fearsome critter that, unlike other reptiles, can live in cold temperatures and is only active during winter months.

== Standard depiction ==
As with any subject of folklore, details about the snow snake vary depending on the storyteller. However, most accounts purport that the snow snake is a highly venomous, white-colored serpent that lives in the snow. Occasional details have been offered regarding the eyes of a snow snake such as them being blue or pink in color. The snow snake's white coloration is said to make the animal nearly indiscernible to any observer against freshly laid snow. Hence, snow snakes held a prominent place in regional practical jokes played on those unfamiliar with the outdoors. Habitually, unexplained markings in the snow were attributed to snow snakes as part of the joke. The name snow snake may have been derived from a Native American winter sport of the same name.

== Variations ==
Author J. E. Rockwell in a 1910 article entitled, "Some Lumberjack Myths", published in The Outer's Book, a nature journal, makes express mention of snow snakes but describes them as freezing in the wintertime rather than thriving in it. Rockwell adds that, after felling timber, lumberjacks would place the logs onto the backs of frozen snow snakes. Subsequently in the spring, when the snakes would thaw out, they would approach the river for a drink, inadvertently carrying the logs where they might be driven downriver to the sawmills. Rockwell's account is unique, as no other known source deviates from the snow snake's proneness to cold. Another deviation comes in the form of the "shovel-tailed snow snake". This iteration is featured on a postcard advertising the "Friendly" Buckhorn Tavern in Rice Lake, Wisconsin. This establishment was known for showcasing fearsome critters often created through taxidermy. The pictured image displays a snake-like effigy, looking as if carved from a tree branch, with speckled patches: the body terminating in a spade-shaped growth.

== See also ==
- Hoop snake
- Joint snake
- European Adder, a real snake species that lives near the Arctic Circle.
