= Romblon Province false gecko =

Scientific classification
- Kingdom: Animalia
- Phylum: Chordata
- Class: Reptilia
- Order: Squamata
- Suborder: Gekkota
- Family: Gekkonidae
- Genus: Pseudogekko
- Species: P. isapa

Binomial name
- Pseudogekko isapa Siler, Davis, Diesmos, Guinto, Whitsett, & Brown, 2016

Species of lizard

The Romblon Province false gecko (Pseudogekko isapa) is a species of gecko. It is endemic to the Philippines.
