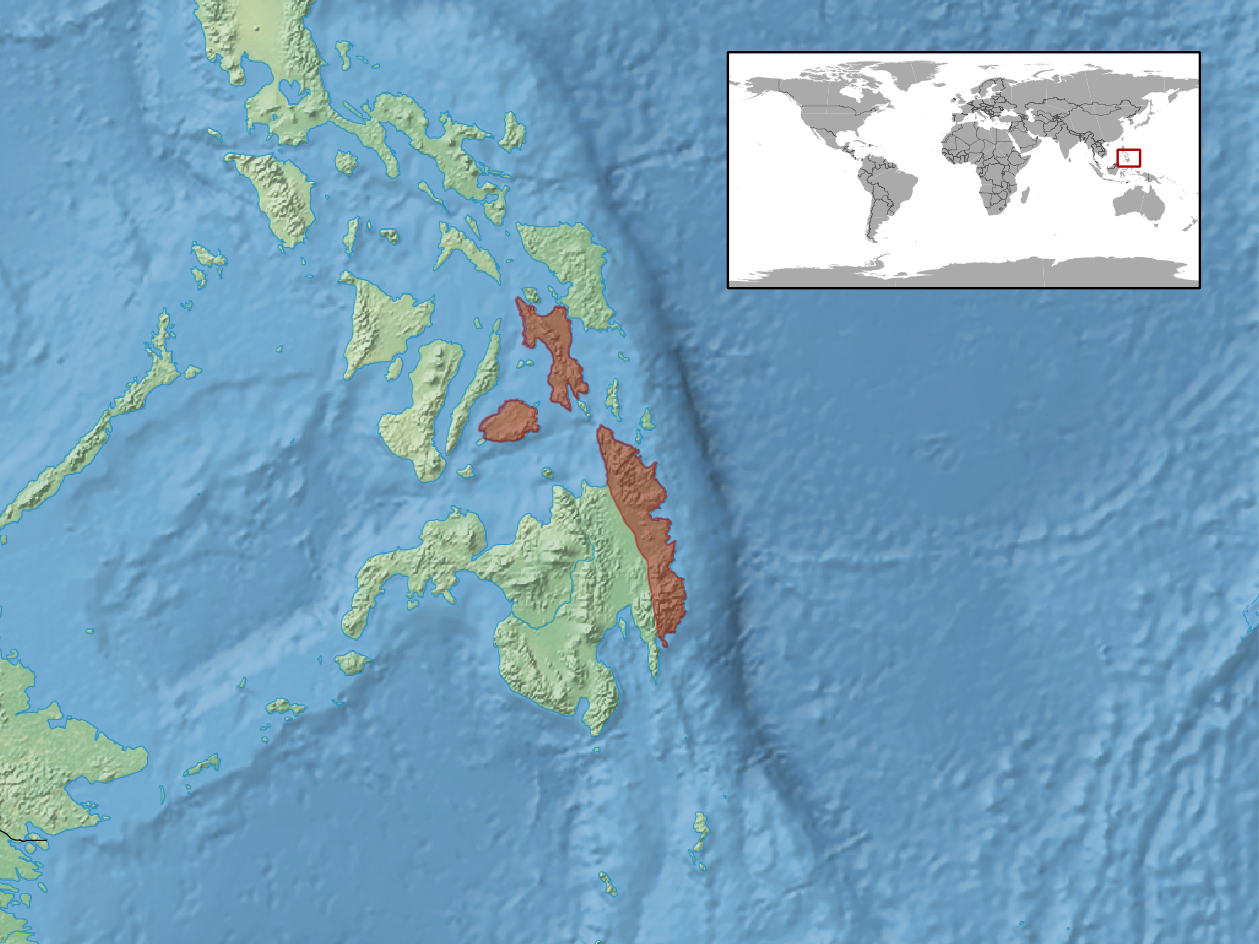
- Geographic distribution of pinoyscincus mindanensis

Conservation status
- Least Concern (IUCN 3.1)

Scientific classification
- Kingdom: Animalia
- Phylum: Chordata
- Class: Reptilia
- Order: Squamata
- Family: Scincidae
- Genus: Pinoyscincus
- Species: P. mindanensis

Binomial name
- Pinoyscincus mindanensis (Taylor, 1915)

Synonyms
- Sphenomorphus mindanensis Taylor, 1915; Pinoyscincus mindanensis — Linkem, Diesmos & R. Brown, 2011

= Pinoyscincus mindanensis =

Species of lizard

The Mindanao sphenomorphus (Pinoyscincus mindanensis) is a species of skink, a lizard in the family Scincidae. The species is endemic to the Philippines.

== Geographic range ==
P. mindanensis is found in the southern Philippines, on the islands of Bohol, Leyte, and Mindanao.

== Habitat ==
The preferred natural habitat of P. mindanensis is forest, at altitudes of 500–1,500 m (1,600–4,900 ft).

== Description ==
Adults of P. mindanensis have a snout-to-vent length (SVL) of about 5 cm (2.0 in).

== Reproduction ==
The mode of reproduction of P. mindanensis is unknown.
