= Bicol false gecko =

Scientific classification
- Kingdom: Animalia
- Phylum: Chordata
- Class: Reptilia
- Order: Squamata
- Suborder: Gekkota
- Family: Gekkonidae
- Genus: Pseudogekko
- Species: P. sumiklab

Binomial name
- Pseudogekko sumiklab Siler, Davis, Watters, Freitas, Griffith, Binaday, Lobos Amarga, & Brown, 2017

Species of lizard

The Bicol false gecko (Pseudogekko sumiklab) is a species of gecko. It is endemic to the Philippines.

In fact, P. sumiklab is relatively new and found to be the only known member of the Pseudogekko brevipes species.

== Habitat ==
The Bicol false gecko was discovered at the bank of a stream, in a tree, at low elevation in a part of a secondary growth forest on Luzon Island.
