= Pseudorabdion torquatum =

Conservation status
- Data Deficient (IUCN 3.1)

Scientific classification
- Kingdom: Animalia
- Phylum: Chordata
- Class: Reptilia
- Order: Squamata
- Suborder: Serpentes
- Family: Colubridae
- Genus: Pseudorabdion
- Species: P. torquatum

Binomial name
- Pseudorabdion torquatum A.M.C. Duméril, Bibron, & A.H.A. Duméril, 1854

Species of snake

Pseudorabdion torquatum is a species of snake in the family Colubridae. The species is found in Indonesia.
