= Pseudorabdion ater =

Conservation status
- Data Deficient (IUCN 3.1)

Scientific classification
- Kingdom: Animalia
- Phylum: Chordata
- Class: Reptilia
- Order: Squamata
- Suborder: Serpentes
- Family: Colubridae
- Genus: Pseudorabdion
- Species: P. ater

Binomial name
- Pseudorabdion ater (Taylor, 1922)

Species of snake

Pseudorabdion ater, the Zamboanga burrowing snake, is a species of snake in the family Colubridae. The species is endemic to the Philippines.
