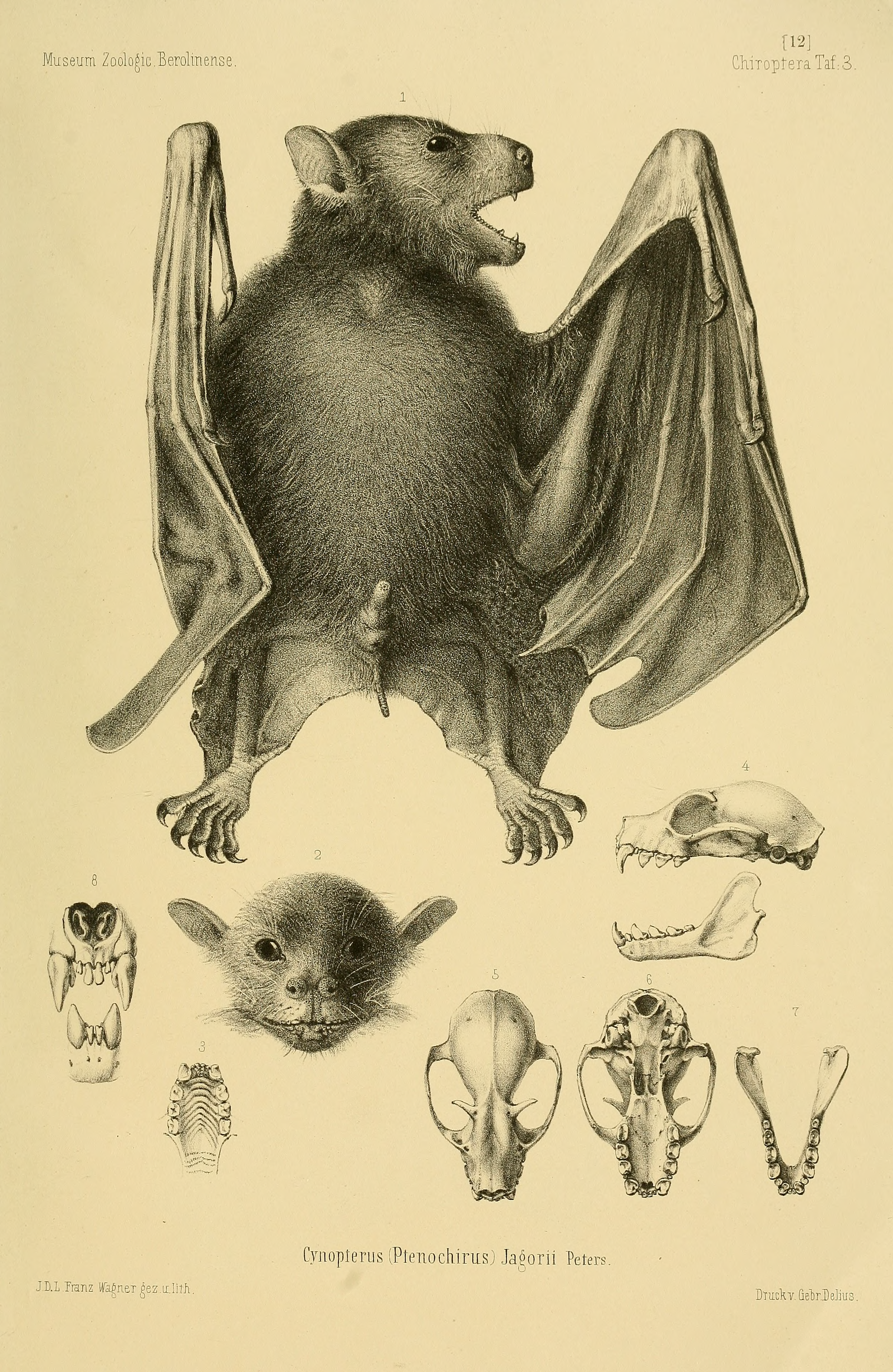
- Greater musky fruit bat (Ptenochirus jagori)

Scientific classification
- Kingdom: Animalia
- Phylum: Chordata
- Class: Mammalia
- Order: Chiroptera
- Family: Pteropodidae
- Genus: Ptenochirus; Peters, 1861

Type species
- Pachysoma (Ptenochirus) jagori Peters, 1861

= Ptenochirus =

Genus of bats

Ptenochirus is a genus of bat in the family Pteropodidae. It contains the following species:

- Greater musky fruit bat, Ptenochirus jagori
- Lesser musky fruit bat, Ptenochirus minor
- White-collared fruit bat, Ptenochirus wetmorei

Both Ptenochirus jagori and Ptenochirus minor are endemic to the Philippines and seed dispersers of diverse trees. They prefer fruit from Ficus species.
