= Pinoyscincus coxi =

Conservation status
- Least Concern (IUCN 3.1)

Scientific classification
- Kingdom: Animalia
- Phylum: Chordata
- Class: Reptilia
- Order: Squamata
- Family: Scincidae
- Genus: Pinoyscincus
- Species: P. coxi

Binomial name
- Pinoyscincus coxi (Taylor, 1915)

Synonyms
- Sphenomorphus coxi Taylor, 1922; Lygosoma (Sphenomorphus) coxi — W. Brown & Alcala, 1970; Pinoyscincus coxi — Linkem, Diesmos & R. Brown, 2011

Species of lizard

Pinoyscincus coxi, Cox's sphenomorphus, is a species of skink, a lizard in the family Scincidae. The species is endemic to the Philippines. There are two recognized subspecies.

== Etymology ==
The specific name, coxi, is in honor of Alvin J. Cox who was Director of the Philippines Bureau of Science.

== Habitat ==
The preferred natural habitat of P. coxi is forest, at altitudes from sea level to 1,600 m (5,200 ft).

== Reproduction ==
The mode of reproduction of P. coxi is unknown.

== Subspecies ==
Two subspecies are recognized as being valid, including the nominotypical subspecies.

- Pinoyscincus coxi coxi (Taylor, 1915)
- Pinoyscincus coxi divergens (Taylor, 1922)

Nota bene: A trinomial authority in parentheses indicates that the subspecies was originally described in a genus other than Pinoyscincus.
