= Pseudorabdion montanum =

Conservation status
- Data Deficient (IUCN 3.1)

Scientific classification
- Kingdom: Animalia
- Phylum: Chordata
- Class: Reptilia
- Order: Squamata
- Suborder: Serpentes
- Family: Colubridae
- Genus: Pseudorabdion
- Species: P. montanum

Binomial name
- Pseudorabdion montanum Leviton & W.C. Brown, 1959

Species of snake

Pseudorabdion montanum, the mountain burrowing snake, is a species of snake in the family Colubridae. The species is found in the Philippines.
