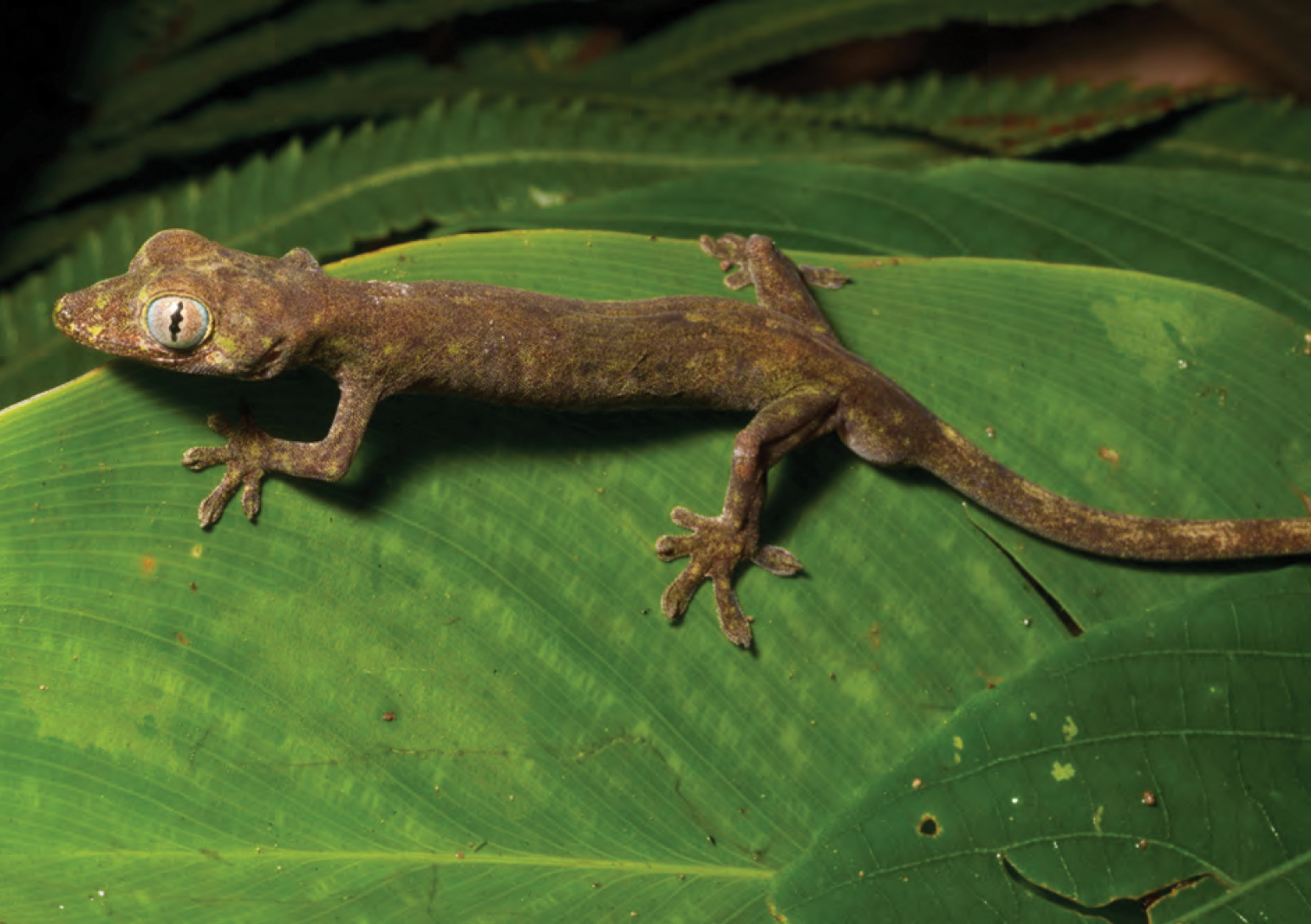
- Pseudogekko compresicorpus

Scientific classification
- Domain: Eukaryota
- Kingdom: Animalia
- Phylum: Chordata
- Class: Reptilia
- Order: Squamata
- Infraorder: Gekkota
- Family: Gekkonidae
- Subfamily: Gekkoninae
- Genus: Pseudogekko; Taylor, 1922

Species
- 10 species (see text)
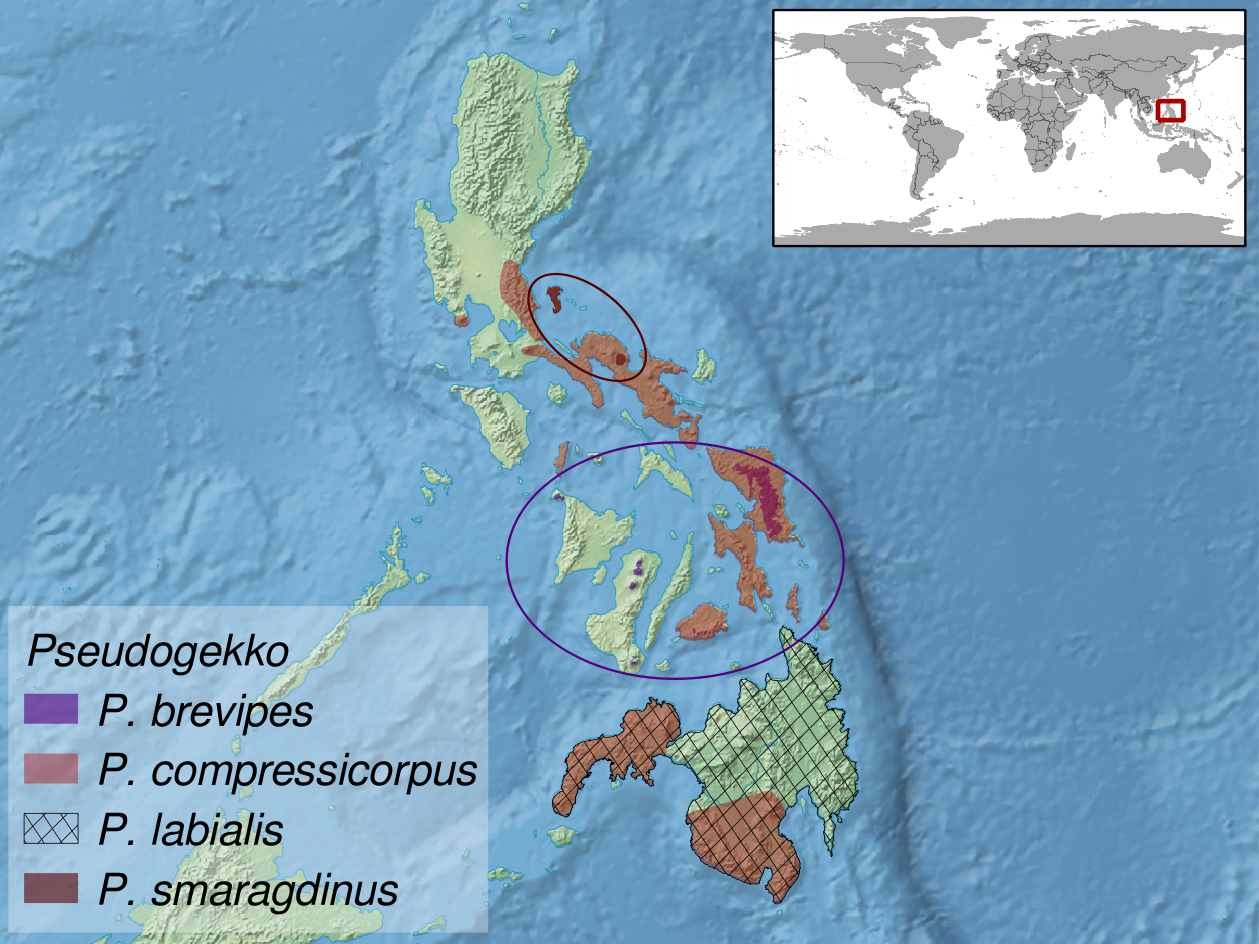

= Pseudogekko =

Genus of lizards

Pseudogekko is a genus of rare gecko species, commonly known as false geckos. All 10 known species are found in the Philippines.

== Species ==
There are ten species:

- Central Visayan false gecko, Pseudogekko atiorum Davis, Watters, Köhler, Whitsett, Huron, Brown, Diesmos & Siler, 2015
- Luzon false gecko, Pseudogekko brevipes (Boettger, 1867)
- Zamboanga false gecko, Pseudogekko chavacano Siler, Welton, Davis, Watters, Davey, Diesmos, Diesmos & Brown, 2014
- Philippine false gecko, Pseudogekko compresicorpus (Taylor, 1915)
- Leyte diminutive false gecko, Pseudogekko ditoy Siler, Welton, Davis, Watters, Davey, Diesmos, Diesmos, & Brown, 2014
- Bicol hollow-dwelling forest gecko, Pseudogekko hungkag Brown, Meneses, Wood, Fernandez, Cuesta, Clores, Tracy, Buehler, & Siler, 2020
- Romblon Province false gecko, Pseudogekko isapa Siler, Davis, Diesmos, Guinto, Whitsett, & Brown, 2016
- Southern Philippine false gecko, Pseudogekko pungkaypinit Siler, Welton, Davis, Watters, Davey, Diesmos, Diesmos, & Brown, 2014
- Polillo false gecko, Pseudogekko smaragdinus (Taylor, 1922)
- Bicol false gecko, Pseudogekko sumiklab Siler, Davis, Watters, Freitas, Griffith, Binaday, Lobos Amarga, & Brown, 2017
