= Pinoyscincus llanosi =

Conservation status
- Near Threatened (IUCN 3.1)

Scientific classification
- Kingdom: Animalia
- Phylum: Chordata
- Class: Reptilia
- Order: Squamata
- Family: Scincidae
- Genus: Pinoyscincus
- Species: P. llanosi

Binomial name
- Pinoyscincus llanosi (Taylor, 1919)

Synonyms
- Sphenomorphus llanosi Taylor, 1919; Otosaurus llanosi — M.A. Smith, 1937; Sphenomorphus llanosi — W.C. Brown & Alcala, 1980; Pinoyscincus llanosi — Linkem, Diesmos & R.M. Brown, 2011

Species of lizard

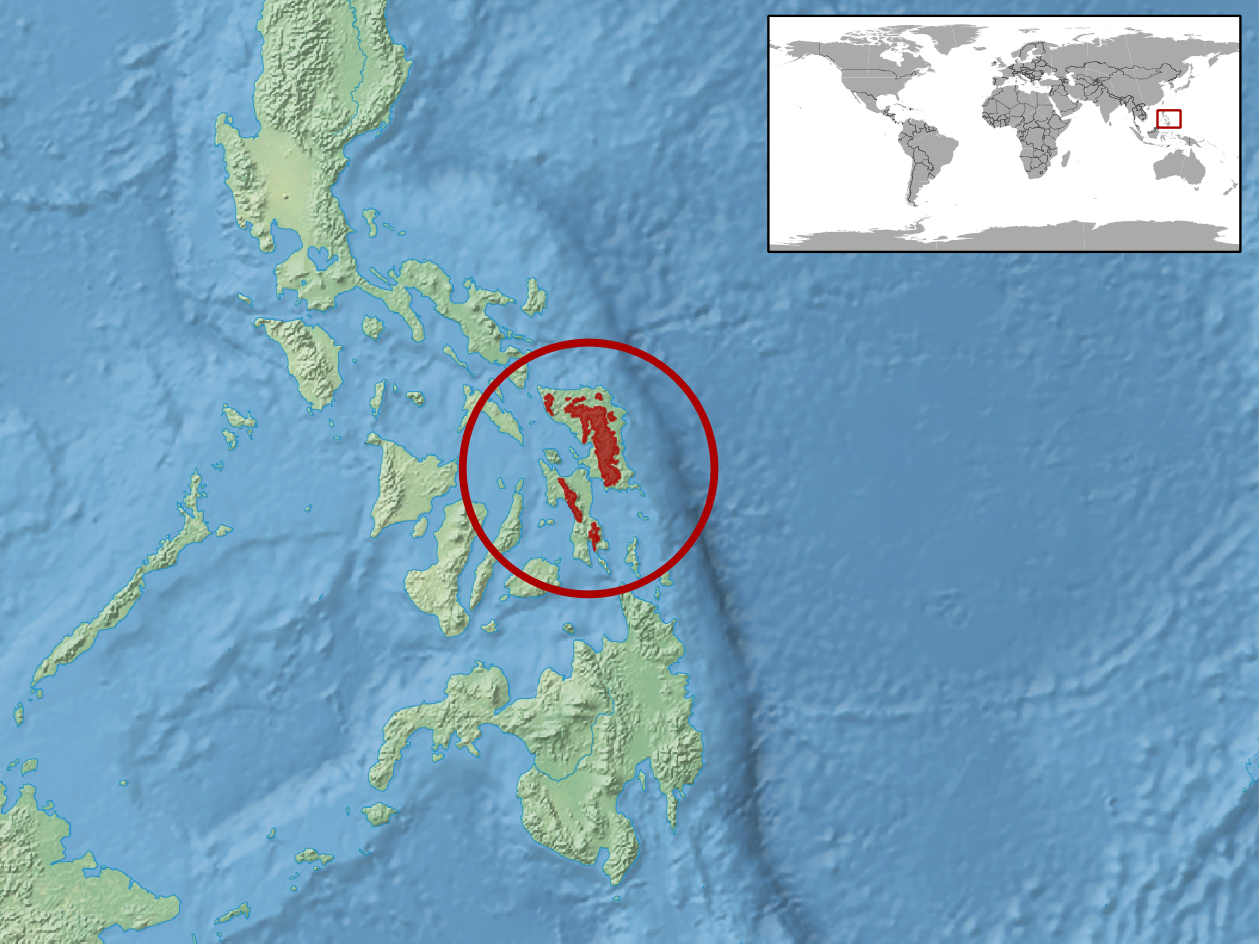
Geographic distribution of Pinoyscincus llanosi

Pinoyscincus llanosi, also known commonly as the Leyte sphenomorphus, is a species of skink, a lizard in the subfamily Sphenomorphinae of the family Scincidae. The species is endemic to the Philippines.

== Etymology ==
The specific name, llanosi, is in honor of Dominican priest Father Florencio Llanos, who was Director of the University of Santo Tomas, Philippines.

== Geographic range ==
P. llanosi is found in the central Philippines, on the islands Leyte and Samar.

== Habitat ==
The preferred natural habitats of P. llanosi are freshwater wetlands and forest, at altitudes of 50–400 m (160–1,310 ft).

== Description ==
Adults of P. llanosi have a snout-to-vent length (SVL) of about 8 cm (3.1 in).

== Reproduction ==
The mode of reproduction of P. llanosi is unknown.
