= Pseudorabdion sarasinorum =

Conservation status
- Vulnerable (IUCN 3.1)

Scientific classification
- Kingdom: Animalia
- Phylum: Chordata
- Class: Reptilia
- Order: Squamata
- Suborder: Serpentes
- Family: Colubridae
- Genus: Pseudorabdion
- Species: P. sarasinorum

Binomial name
- Pseudorabdion sarasinorum (F. Müller, 1895)

Species of snake

Pseudorabdion sarasinorum, Sarasin's reed snake, is a species of snake in the family Colubridae. The species is found in Indonesia.
