= Pseudorabdion saravacense =

Conservation status
- Least Concern (IUCN 3.1)

Scientific classification
- Kingdom: Animalia
- Phylum: Chordata
- Class: Reptilia
- Order: Squamata
- Suborder: Serpentes
- Family: Colubridae
- Genus: Pseudorabdion
- Species: P. saravacense

Binomial name
- Pseudorabdion saravacense (Shelford, 1901)

Species of snake

Pseudorabdion saravacense is a species of snake in the family Colubridae. The species is found in Malaysia and Indonesia.

P. saravacense has been filmed using a rolling or "cartwheeling" motion when attempting to escape a perceived threat (the same behavior has also been observed in P. longiceps and P. collaris). The rolling motion has a twisting element, enabling the snake to keep its head roughly stable even when moving quickly.
