= Pseudorabdion talonuran =

Conservation status
- Vulnerable (IUCN 3.1)

Scientific classification
- Kingdom: Animalia
- Phylum: Chordata
- Class: Reptilia
- Order: Squamata
- Suborder: Serpentes
- Family: Colubridae
- Genus: Pseudorabdion
- Species: P. talonuran

Binomial name
- Pseudorabdion talonuran R.M. Brown, Leviton, & Sison, 1999

Species of snake

Pseudorabdion talonuran, the Panay Island reed snake, is a species of snake in the family Colubridae. The species is found in the Philippines.
