= Wildlife of the Philippines =

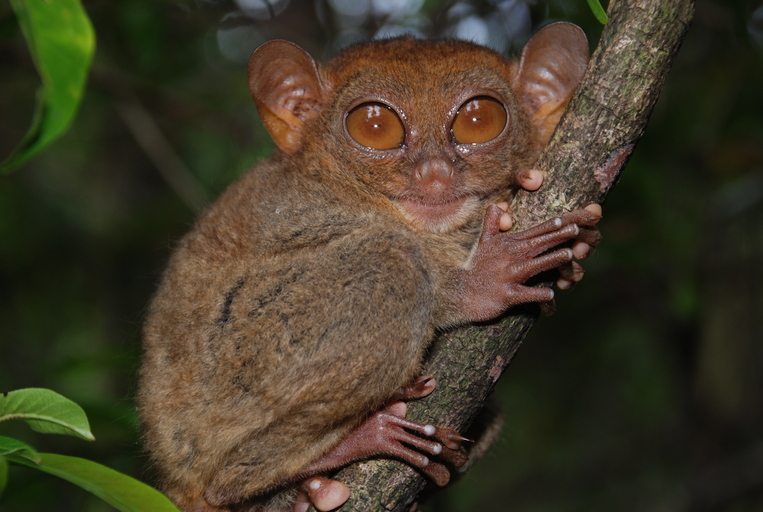
The Philippine tarsier is endemic to the southern Philippines. Philippine spotted deer (Rusa alfredi) Preserved tamaraw, sea turtles and other animals.

The wildlife of the Philippines includes a significant number of endemic plant and animal species. The country's surrounding waters reportedly have the highest level of marine biodiversity in the world. The Philippines is one of the seventeen megadiverse countries and is a global biodiversity hotspot. In 2013, 700 of the country's 52,177 species were listed as threatened.

The Philippines has among the highest rates of species discovery in the world with 16 new species of mammal discovered in the last ten years. Because of this, the degree of endemism in the Philippines has risen and will likely continue to rise.

Some of the smallest and largest animals and plants are found in the Philippines. These include the smallest primate (tarsier), the biggest moth (Atlas moth, or mariposa in Tagalog), the smallest deer (Philippine mouse-deer or pilandok), the smallest fish (Philippine goby), and the biggest fish (whale shark).

== Birds ==
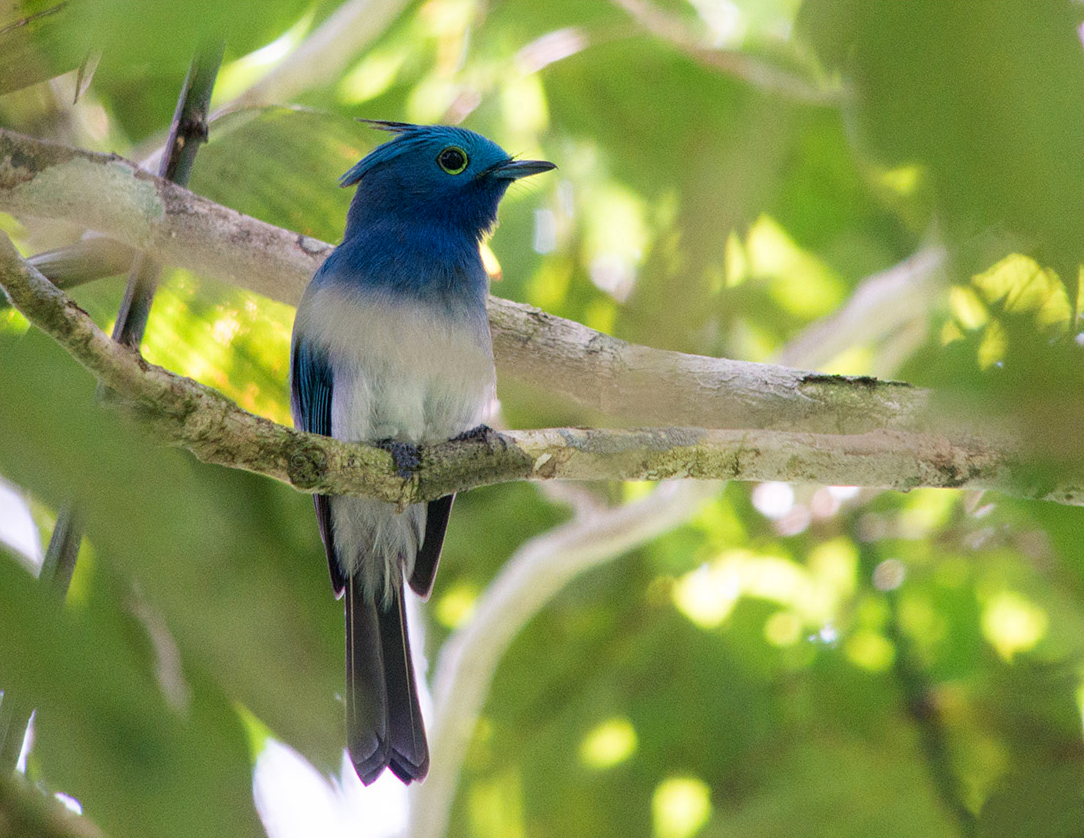
The celestial monarch is only found in the Philippines. It is threatened by habitat loss.

There are 714 species of birds in the Philippines, of which 243 are endemic, three have been introduced by humans, and 52 are rare or accidental occurrences. The Philippines has the third-highest number of endemic birds, behind the much larger countries of Australia and Indonesia. There are 67 globally threatened species, including the rufous hornbill and the critically endangered national bird of the Philippines, the Philippine eagle or monkey-eating eagle. Until 1995, the national bird of the Philippines was the maya (which, in the Philippines, refers to a variety of small, commonly observed passerine bird). The Philippines is also home to Tawi-Tawi's blue-winged racket-tail, the most endangered parrot species in Southeast Asia, the Sulu hornbill, one of the most endangered animals in the world with a population of just 27, and the Calayan rail, the most endangered species of rail in the world, found only on a small island in the Babuyan Islands.

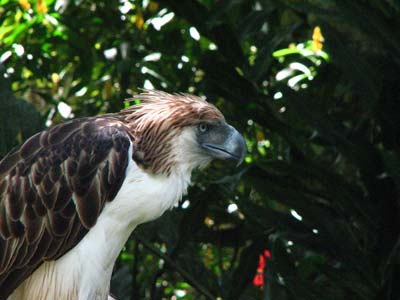
A Philippine eagle at Philippine Eagle Center in Davao City.

According to the EDGE of Existence Programme of the Zoological Society of London, the Philippines has the highest level of bird endemism in the world. Six of the world's 50 most evolutionary distinct and globally endangered (EDGE) species are found in the Philippines. These species are the Philippine eagle (15th place, the highest from the Philippines), spoon-billed sandpiper (#19), black-hooded coucal (#22), Sulu hornbill (#41), Cebu brown-dove (#46), and rufous-headed hornbill (#50). Previously, in 2013, when the list was up to 100, the various bleeding heart dove species, found only in the Philippines, and the Philippine cockatoo were also on the list.

== Amphibians and reptiles ==
There are more than 111 species of amphibian and 270 species of reptile in the Philippines, of which 80% and 70% are endemic, respectively. Of the 114 species of snake, it is thought that no more than 14 are venomous. Several species of reptiles and amphibians remains undescribed. The Philippines also has 50–60 endemic Platymantis frog species, making it by far the most diverse genus of amphibians in the archipelago.

The endemic freshwater crocodile Crocodylus mindorensis is critically endangered and is considered the most threatened crocodilian in the world. In 1982, wild populations were estimated to be only 500–1,000 individuals; by 1995 a mere 100 crocodiles remained living in the wild. The recent discovery of a population of this species in the Sierra Madre mountains of Luzon brings new hope for its conservation. Projects are being conducted in an effort to save the crocodiles. The Crocodile Rehabilitation, Observance and Conservation (CROC) Project of the Mabuwaya Foundation is active in carrying out such projects.

Other threatened reptiles include Gray's monitor and the Philippine forest turtle. Of the three species of frugivorous monitor lizards globally, two occur in the Philippines: the Panay monitor lizard from the island of Panay and Northern Sierra Madre forest monitor from north east Luzon.

== Marine animals ==
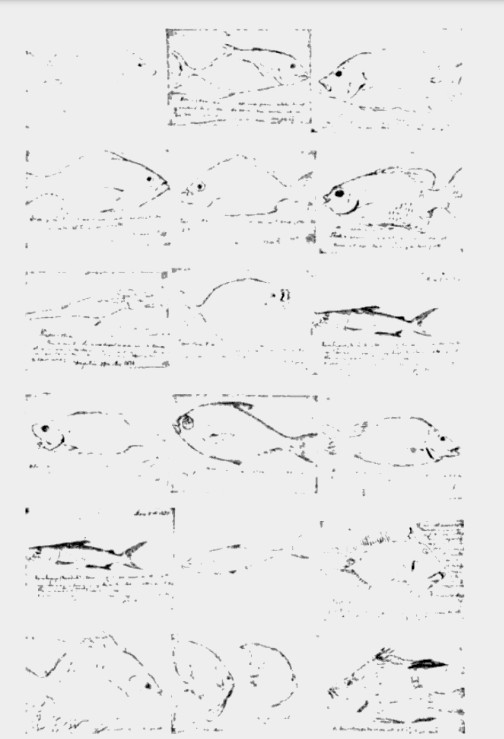
Drawings by Jose Rizal of the different species of fish found in Dapitan, c. 1890s

Among the seas of the Philippines' 7,107 islands there is great diversity of marine animals. Butanding, or whale shark, the largest fish, can be found in the province of Sorsogon. The dwarf pygmy goby or Philippine goby (Pandaca pygmaea), is one of the shortest and lightest freshwater fish in the world with a size of 9-11 mm; about the size of a grain of rice. The milkfish or bangus (Chanos chanos), can also be found in oceans and can be cultivated in freshwater of Hagonoy, Bulacan, and other provinces. Yellow-fin tuna, blue marlin, red snapper, swordfish, flying fish, parrot fish, puffer fish, jack, manta ray, and pink salmon are also found in the Philippines. The biggest clam, Tridacna gigas, is found in the Philippines. One of the heaviest bony fish in the world, the ocean sunfish (Mola mola), can also be found in the country.

== Freshwater fish ==
The Philippines has about 330 species of freshwater fish, including nine endemic genera and more than 65 endemic species, many of which are confined to single lakes. An example is Sardinella tawilis, a freshwater sardine found only in Taal Lake. Lake Lanao, in Mindanao, seems to be experiencing the country's most catastrophic extinction event, with nearly all of the lake's endemic fish species now almost certainly extinct, primarily due to the introduction of tilapia for the expansion of the fishing industry. Other exotic species were also introduced to the lake.

== Insects and other invertebrates ==
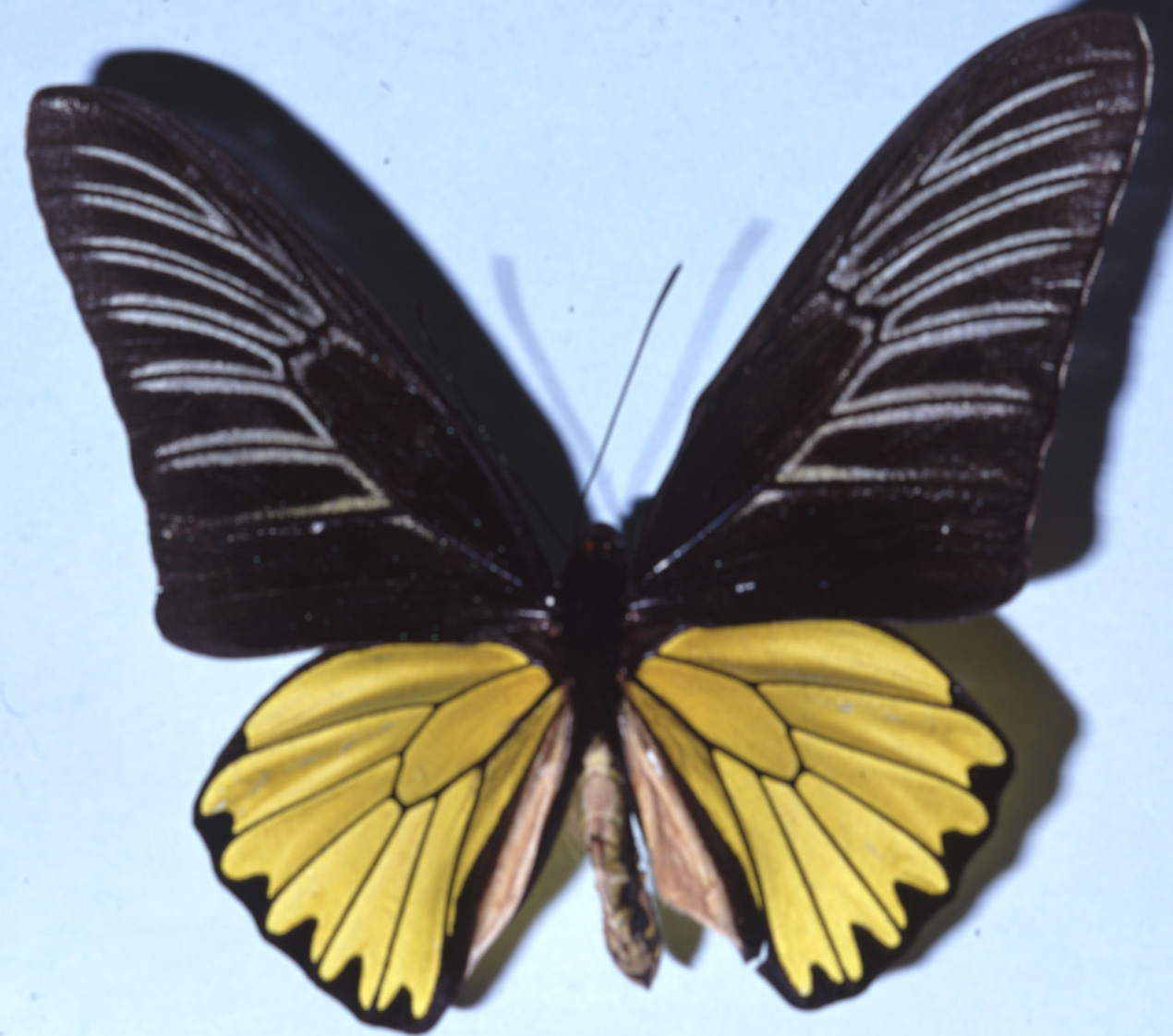
Troides magellanus, also known as the Magellan birdwing butterfly

About 70% of the Philippines' nearly 21,000 recorded insect species are found only in the country. In addition, about one-third of the 915 butterflies found here are endemic to the country, and over 110 of the more than 130 species of tiger beetle are found nowhere else. One of the largest butterflies in the world and the largest in the Philippines, the Magellan birdwing, can be found here. The largest moth, the Atlas moth, can also be found in the Philippines.

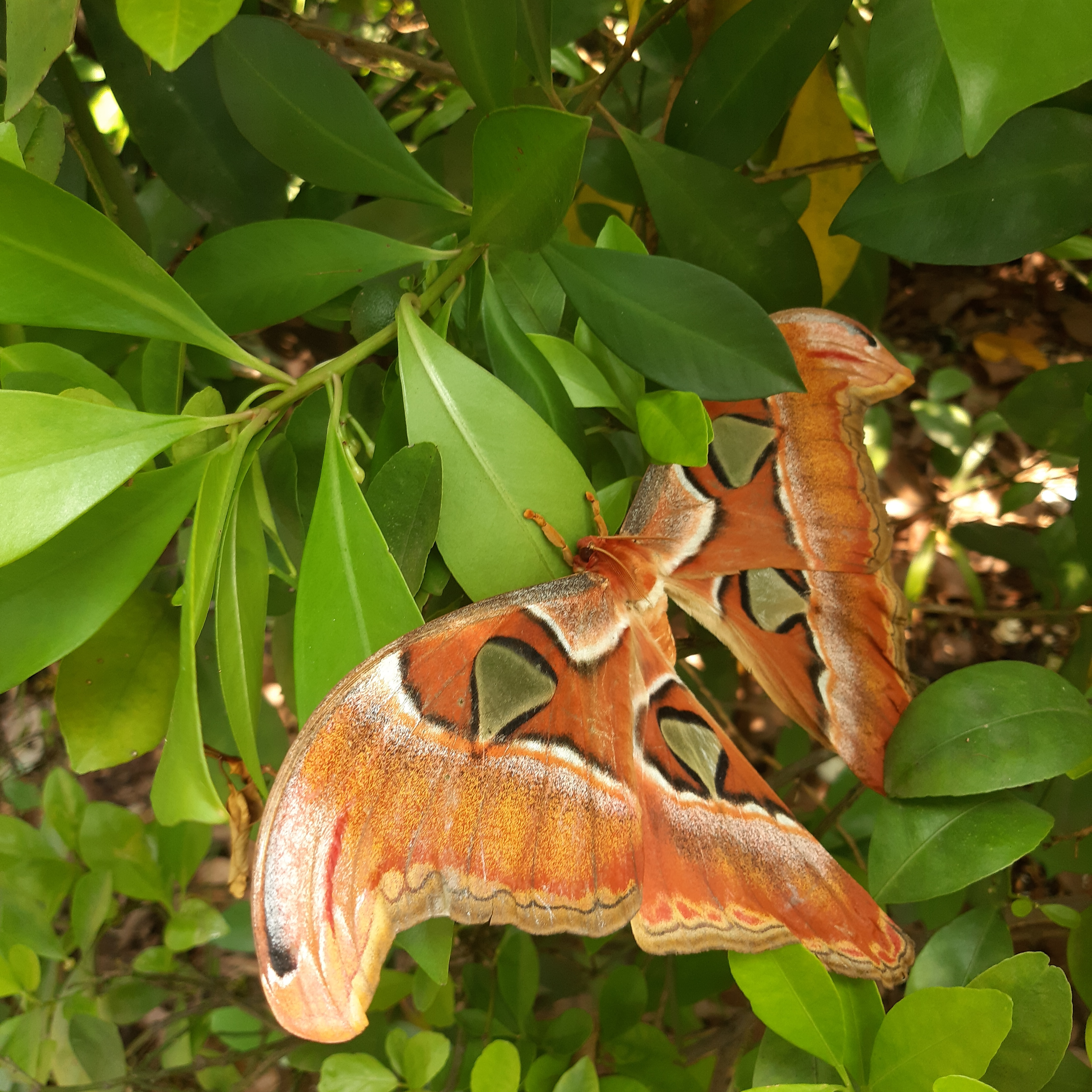
Atlas moth

Crustaceans are very diverse in the archipelago. More than 50 species of freshwater crabs (in the genera Carpomon, Insulamon, Isolapotamon, Mainitia, Mindoron, Ovitamon, Parathelphusa, and Sundathelphusa) are known from the Philippines and all are endemic to the country.

== See also ==
- List of extinct animals of the Philippines
- List of threatened species of the Philippines
- List of non-marine molluscs of the Philippines
- List of endemic birds of the Philippines
- List of mammals of the Philippines
- Environmental issues in the Philippines
- Wildlife of Palawan
- List of amphibians and reptiles of Cebu
