= Pinoyscincus =

Scientific classification
- Kingdom: Animalia
- Phylum: Chordata
- Class: Reptilia
- Order: Squamata
- Family: Scincidae
- Subfamily: Sphenomorphinae
- Genus: Pinoyscincus; Linkem, Diesmos & R.M. Brown, 2011

Species
- Five species, see text.

Genus of lizards

Pinoyscincus is a genus of skinks, lizards in the family Scincidae. All species in the genus are endemic to the Philippines. Species in this genus were previously assigned to the genus Sphenomorphus.

== Species ==
The following five species, listed alphabetically by specific name, are recognized as being valid:

- Pinoyscincus abdictus (W.C. Brown & Alcala, 1980)
- Pinoyscincus coxi (Taylor, 1915) – Cox's sphenomorphus
- Pinoyscincus jagori (W. Peters, 1864) – Jagor's sphenomorphus
- Pinoyscincus llanosi (Taylor, 1919) – Leyte sphenomorphus
- Pinoyscincus mindanensis (Taylor, 1915) – Mindanao sphenomorphus

Nota bene: A binomial authority in parentheses indicates that the species was originally described in a genus other than Pinoyscincus.
