= Lesser musky fruit bat =

lesser musky fruit bat

Conservation status
- Least Concern (IUCN 3.1)

Scientific classification
- Kingdom: Animalia
- Phylum: Chordata
- Class: Mammalia
- Order: Chiroptera
- Family: Pteropodidae
- Genus: Ptenochirus
- Species: P. minor

Binomial name
- Ptenochirus minor Yoshiyuki, 1979
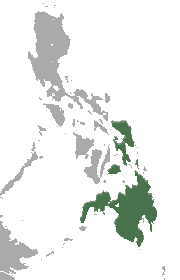
- Lesser musky fruit bat range

Species of bat

The lesser musky fruit bat (Ptenochirus minor) is a species of megabat in the family Pteropodidae. It is endemic to the Philippines.
