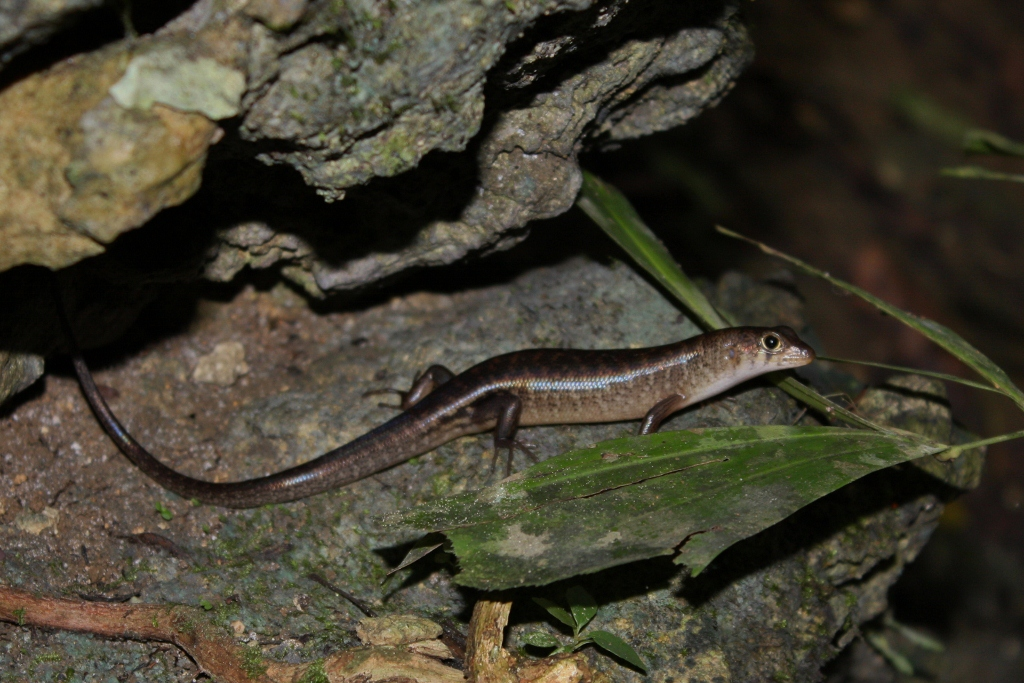

Conservation status
- Least Concern (IUCN 3.1)

Scientific classification
- Kingdom: Animalia
- Phylum: Chordata
- Class: Reptilia
- Order: Squamata
- Family: Scincidae
- Genus: Pinoyscincus
- Species: P. jagori

Binomial name
- Pinoyscincus jagori (W. Peters, 1864)

Synonyms
- Lygosoma (Hinulia) jagorii W. Peters, 1864; Lygosoma jagorii — Boulenger, 1887; Sphenomorphus jagori — Stejneger, 1908; Pinoyscincus jagori — Linkem, Diesmos & R. Brown, 2011

= Pinoyscincus jagori =

Species of lizard

Pinoyscincus jagori, Jagor's sphenomorphus, is a species of skink, a lizard in the family Scincidae. The species is endemic to the Philippines. There are two recognized subspecies.

== Etymology ==
The specific name, jagori, is in honor of German naturalist Fedor Jagor.

== Habitat ==
The preferred natural habitat of P. jagori is forest, at altitudes from sea level to 1,000 m (3,300 ft).

== Description ==
Dorsally, P. jagori is brown, with darker and lighter variegations. Adults have a snout-to-vent length (SVL) of about 9 cm (3.5 in). The tail length exceeds the SVL.

== Reproduction ==
P. jagori is oviparous.

== Subspecies ==
Two subspecies are recognized as being valid, including the nominotypical subspecies.

- Pinoyscincus jagori grandis (Taylor, 1922)
- Pinoyscincus jagori jagori (W. Peters, 1864)

Nota bene: A trinomial authority in parentheses indicates that the subspecies was originally described in a genus other than Pinoyscincus.
