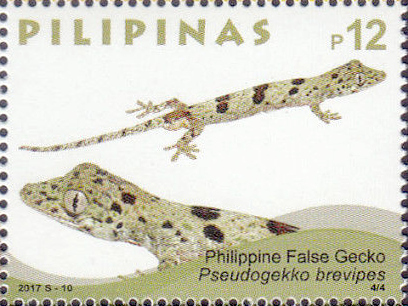

Conservation status
- Vulnerable (IUCN 3.1)

Scientific classification
- Kingdom: Animalia
- Phylum: Chordata
- Class: Reptilia
- Order: Squamata
- Suborder: Gekkota
- Family: Gekkonidae
- Genus: Pseudogekko
- Species: P. brevipes

Binomial name
- Pseudogekko brevipes (Boettger, 1867)
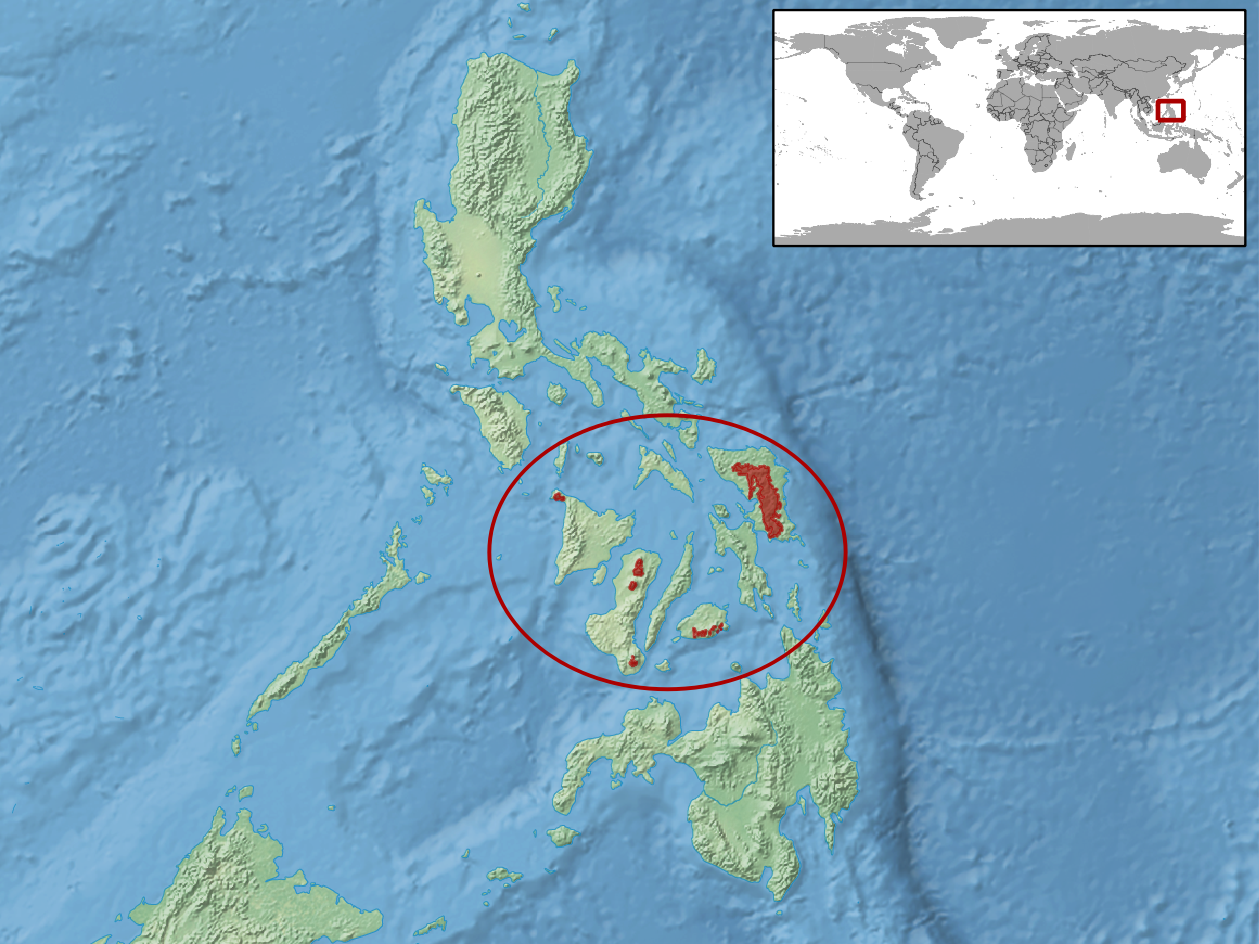

Synonyms
- Lepidodactylus brevipes

= Pseudogekko brevipes =

Species of lizard

Pseudogekko brevipes, also known as Luzon false gecko or orange-spotted smooth-scaled gecko, is a species of geckos. It is endemic to central Philippines, where it is found on several islands in dipterocarp and submontane forest at elevations of 300 to 1100 m above sea level.
