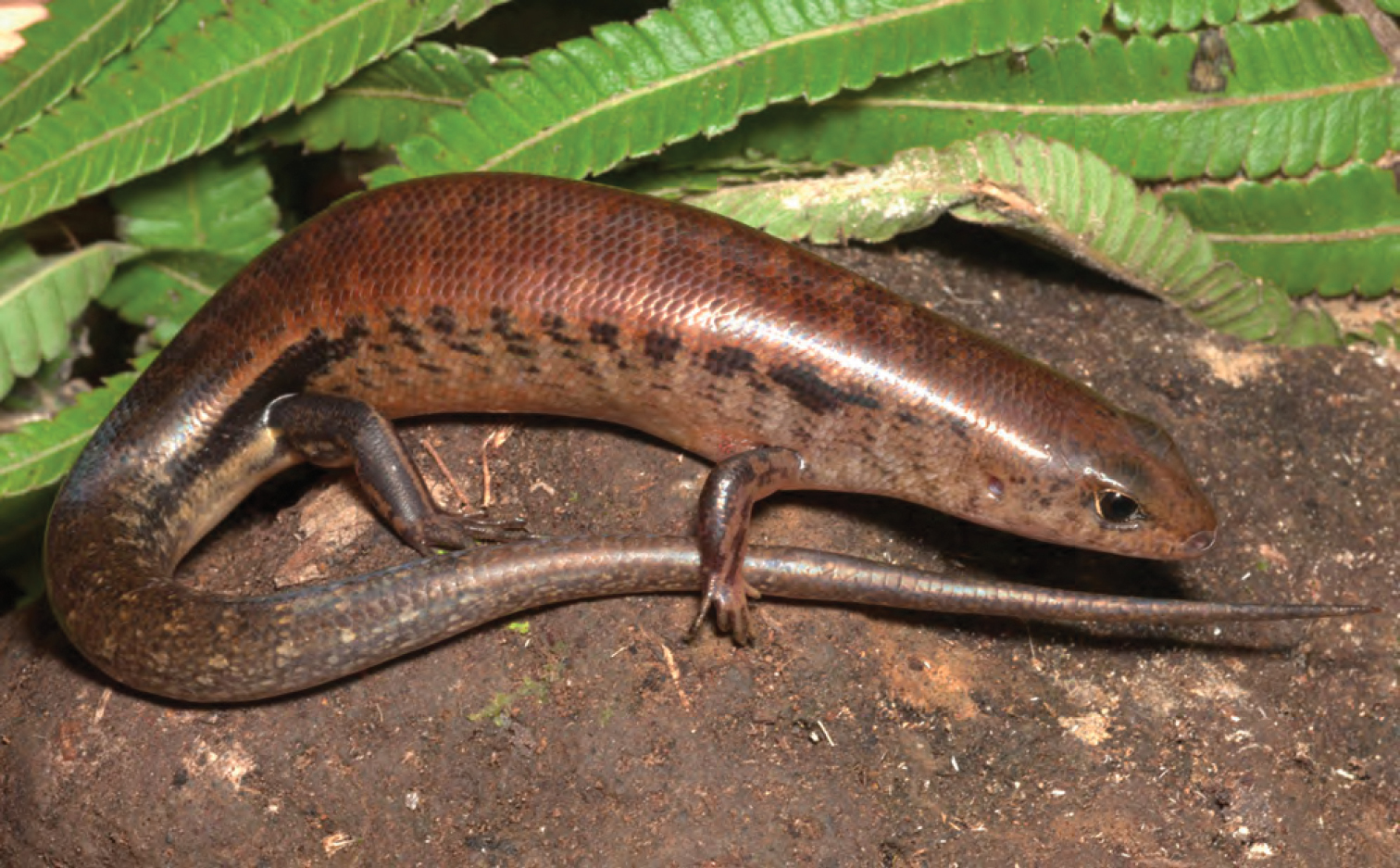

Conservation status
- Least Concern (IUCN 3.1)

Scientific classification
- Kingdom: Animalia
- Phylum: Chordata
- Class: Reptilia
- Order: Squamata
- Family: Scincidae
- Genus: Pinoyscincus
- Species: P. abdictus

Binomial name
- Pinoyscincus abdictus (W. Brown & Alcala, 1980)

Synonyms
- Sphenomorphus abdictus W. Brown & Alcala, 1980; Pinoyscincus abdictus — Linkem, Diesmos & R. Brown, 2011

= Pinoyscincus abdictus =

Species of lizard

Pinoyscincus abdictus is a species of skink, a lizard in the family Scincidae. The species is endemic to the Philippines. There are two recognized subspecies.

== Habitat ==
The preferred natural habitat of P. abdictus is forest, at altitudes from sea level to 1,000 m (3,300 ft).

== Reproduction ==
The mode of reproduction of P. abdictus is unknown.

== Subspecies ==
Two subspecies are recognized as being valid, including the nominotypical subspecies.

- Pinoyscincus abdictus abdictus (W. Brown & Alcala, 1980)
- Pinoyscincus abdictus aquilonius (W. Brown & Alcala, 1980)

Nota bene: A trinomial authority in parentheses indicates that the subspecies was originally described in a genus other than Pinoyscincus.
