= Pseudorabdion collaris =

Conservation status
- Least Concern (IUCN 3.1)

Scientific classification
- Kingdom: Animalia
- Phylum: Chordata
- Class: Reptilia
- Order: Squamata
- Suborder: Serpentes
- Family: Colubridae
- Genus: Pseudorabdion
- Species: P. collaris

Binomial name
- Pseudorabdion collaris (Mocquard, 1892)

Species of snake

Pseudorabdion collaris, Mocquard's reed snake or common collared snake, is a species of snake in the family Colubridae. The species is found in Indonesia, Malaysia, and Brunei.

P. collaris has been observed to try and escape perceived danger by rolling, launching itself into the air on its tail in a movement resembling a cartwheel but which allows the snake's head to stay roughly stable. The same behavior has been recorded in Pseudorabdion longiceps and Pseudorabdion saravacense.
