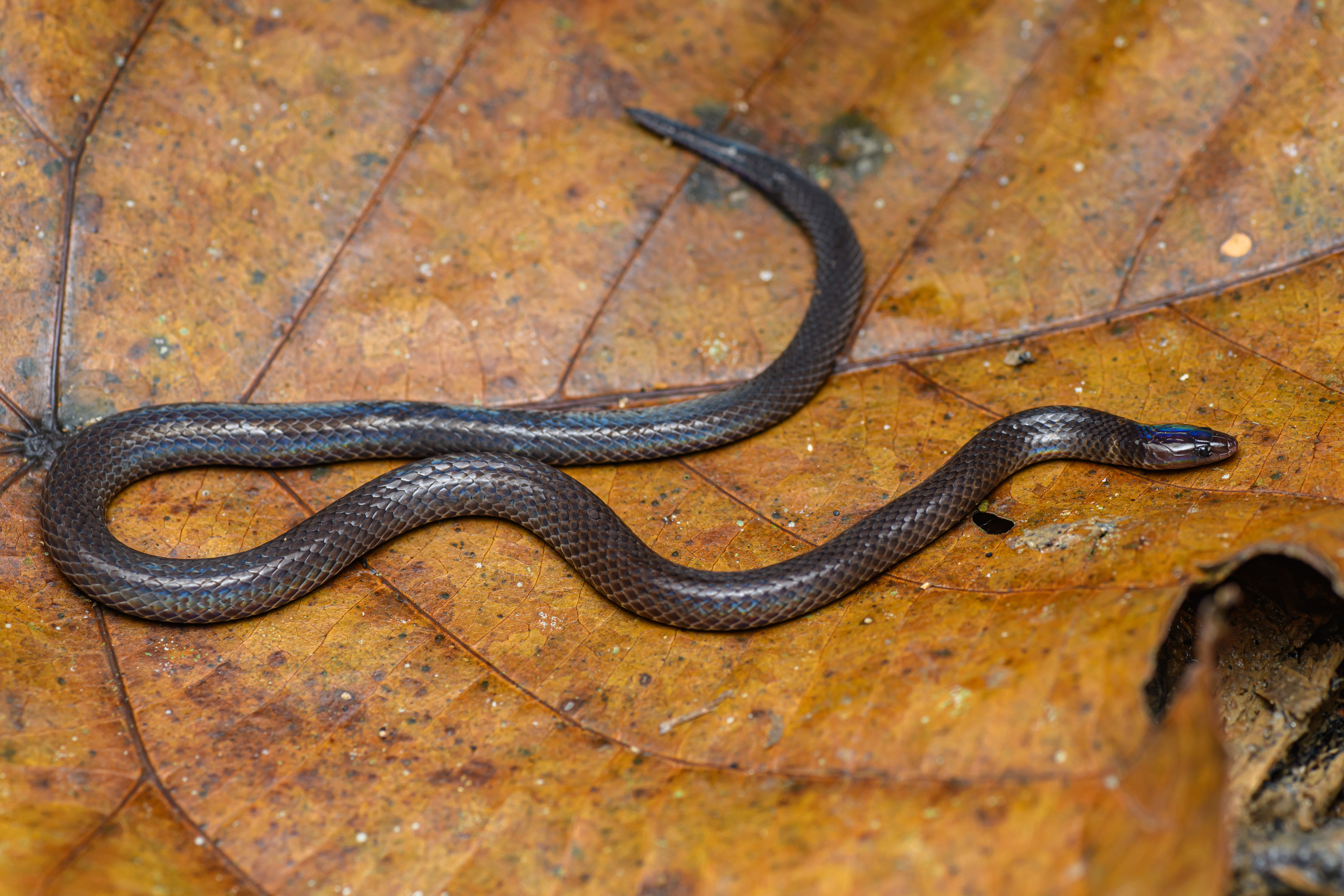

Conservation status
- Least Concern (IUCN 3.1)

Scientific classification
- Kingdom: Animalia
- Phylum: Chordata
- Class: Reptilia
- Order: Squamata
- Suborder: Serpentes
- Family: Colubridae
- Genus: Pseudorabdion
- Species: P. longiceps

Binomial name
- Pseudorabdion longiceps (Cantor, 1847)

= Pseudorabdion longiceps =

Species of snake

Pseudorabdion longiceps, the dwarf reed snake or Cantor's dwarf reed snake, is a species of snake in the family Colubridae. The species is found in Indonesia, Malaysia, Brunei, Singapore, Thailand, and the Philippines.

== Classification ==
It was first classified by Theodore Cantor in 1847 and originally named Calamaria longiceps. The type specimen was collected in Penang and is now held by the Natural History Museum, London.

== Behavior ==
Dwarf reed snakes are nocturnal, semi-fossorial (adapted to living underground) and shy. When above ground, they often hide under objects or among fallen leaves. They have not been extensively studied, partly because they are hard to find. They measure 11–28 centimetres (4.3–11.0 in) long.

It is known to be preyed on by larger snakes, including the banded coral snake Calliophis intestinalis; by birds such as the slaty-backed forktail; and by Scolopendra subspinipes, a species of extremely large centipede.

=== Cartwheeling ===
A 2023 study recorded a dwarf reed snake "cartwheeling" to escape when startled; video may be seen here. The rolling motion is four times faster than the snake's normal slither, reaching speeds of around 9 miles per hour (14 km/h), and requires a great deal of energy, limiting its use to emergencies such as an immediate threat. The authors of the 2023 paper speculated that it may also hinder predators by confusing them, or by making the snake's scent trail harder to follow, as only a small portion of the snake's body contacts the ground. The cartwheel may have evolved from simpler saltation (jumping) defense mechanisms, which are known in several different groups of snakes.

A 2026 paper found that the 'cartwheel' is produced by a complex and precise chain of twisting movements that allow the snake to keep its head approximately stable even when rolling at high speed. The study also observed the same behavior in other members of the genus, Pseudorabdion saravacense and Pseudorabdion collaris. (A fourth species, Pseudorabdion albonuchalis, has also been reported to cartwheel and caught on video, though not in lab conditions.) The 2026 study used (non-dwarf) reed snakes of genus Calamaria as a control group, which did not cartwheel. It is not yet known whether the cartwheeling relies on something unique about Pseudorabdion anatomy or brain structure, or whether other snakes would be physically capable of the movement but never developed the behavior.

The cartwheel is reminiscent of the behavior attributed to the hoop snake of North American and Australian folklore.
