= Pseudogekko hungkag =

Scientific classification
- Kingdom: Animalia
- Phylum: Chordata
- Class: Reptilia
- Order: Squamata
- Suborder: Gekkota
- Family: Gekkonidae
- Genus: Pseudogekko
- Species: P. hungkag

Binomial name
- Pseudogekko hungkag Brown, Meneses, Wood, Fernandez, Cuesta, Clores, Tracy, Buehler & Siler, 2020

Species of lizard

Pseudogekko hungkag, also known as the Bicol hollow-dwelling forest gecko, is a species of gecko. It is endemic to Bicol Peninsula of Luzon, the Philippines. It is a small gecko measuring 42–52 mm (1.7–2.0 in) in snout–vent length. They have a cryptic appearance that allows them to blend into their natural habitat, crevices of hollow spaces on brown tree trunks.
