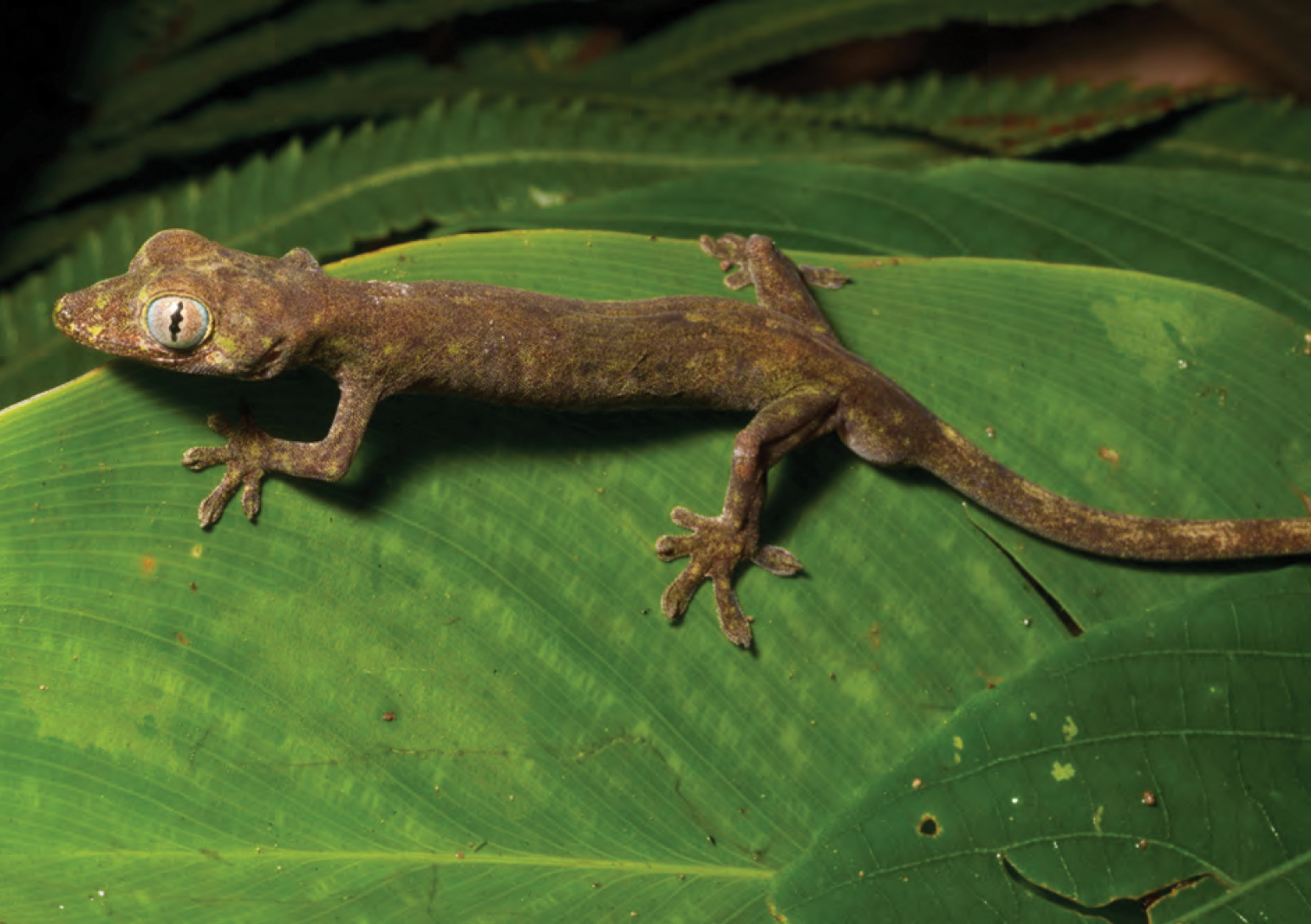

Conservation status
- Least Concern (IUCN 3.1)

Scientific classification
- Kingdom: Animalia
- Phylum: Chordata
- Class: Reptilia
- Order: Squamata
- Suborder: Gekkota
- Family: Gekkonidae
- Genus: Pseudogekko
- Species: P. compresicorpus

Binomial name
- Pseudogekko compresicorpus (Taylor, 1915)

Synonyms
- Luperosaurus compresicorpus; Pseudogekko compressicorpus

= Pseudogekko compresicorpus =

Species of lizard

Pseudogekko compresicorpus, also known as the Philippine false gecko or cylindrical-bodied smooth-scaled gecko or Philippine forest gecko, is a species of geckos. It is endemic to the Philippines. The reproduction pattern is oviparous in nature.
