= Pseudorabdion albonuchalis =

Conservation status
- Least Concern (IUCN 3.1)

Scientific classification
- Kingdom: Animalia
- Phylum: Chordata
- Class: Reptilia
- Order: Squamata
- Suborder: Serpentes
- Family: Colubridae
- Genus: Pseudorabdion
- Species: P. albonuchalis

Binomial name
- Pseudorabdion albonuchalis (Günther, 1896)

Synonyms
- Geophis albonuchalis Günther, 1896; Agrophis albonuchalis (Günther, 1896); Xylophis albonuchalis (Günther, 1896)

Species of snake

Pseudorabdion albonuchalis is a species of snake in the family Colubridae. It is endemic to Borneo and occurs in Sabah and Sarawak (Malaysia), Kalimantan (Indonesia), and Brunei. It is also known as the white-collared reed snake.

== Description ==
Pseudorabdion albonuchalis has a small, slender body and a pointed head. It is oviparous. It is has been recorded performing a roll or "cartwheel" to get away from threats when startled, similar to behavior reported in P. longiceps.

== Habitat and conservation ==
Pseudorabdion albonuchalis occurs in lowland forest at elevations of 50–600 m (160–1,970 ft) above sea level. It is semi-fossorial and lives in leaf litter. It is potentially threatened by deforestation. However, it has a wide range and occurs in many protected areas, and is therefore not considered threatened overall.
