= Pseudorabdion eiselti =

Conservation status
- Least Concern (IUCN 3.1)

Scientific classification
- Kingdom: Animalia
- Phylum: Chordata
- Class: Reptilia
- Order: Squamata
- Suborder: Serpentes
- Family: Colubridae
- Genus: Pseudorabdion
- Species: P. eiselti

Binomial name
- Pseudorabdion eiselti Inger & Leviton, 1961

Species of snake

Pseudorabdion eiselti, Eiselt's dwarf reed snake, is a species of snake in the family Colubridae. The species is found in Indonesia.
