= Pseudorabdion sirambense =

Conservation status
- Data Deficient (IUCN 3.1)

Scientific classification
- Kingdom: Animalia
- Phylum: Chordata
- Class: Reptilia
- Order: Squamata
- Suborder: Serpentes
- Family: Colubridae
- Genus: Pseudorabdion
- Species: P. sirambense

Binomial name
- Pseudorabdion sirambense Doria & Petri, 2010

Species of snake

Pseudorabdion sirambense, the Sirambé dwarf reed snake, is a species of snake in the family Colubridae. The species is found in Indonesia.
