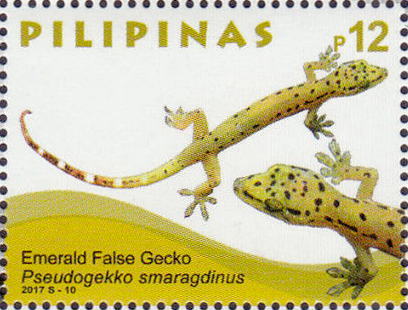

Conservation status
- Least Concern (IUCN 3.1)

Scientific classification
- Domain: Eukaryota
- Kingdom: Animalia
- Phylum: Chordata
- Class: Reptilia
- Order: Squamata
- Infraorder: Gekkota
- Family: Gekkonidae
- Genus: Pseudogekko
- Species: P. smaragdinus

Binomial name
- Pseudogekko smaragdinus Taylor, 1922
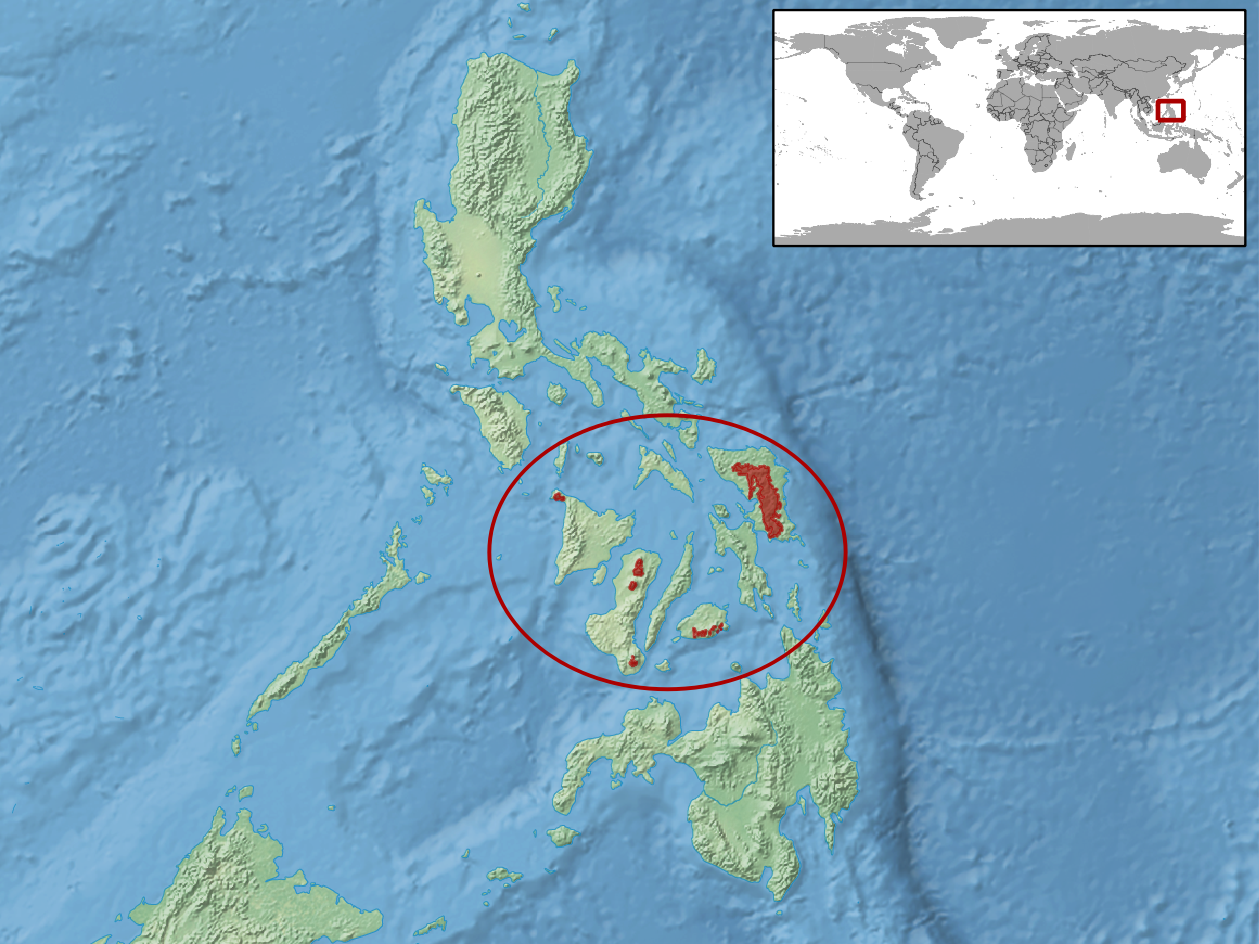

Synonyms
- Gekko smaragdinus

= Pseudogekko smaragdinus =

Species of lizard

Pseudogekko smaragdinus (or green smooth-scaled gecko, Polillo false gecko or emerald false gekko) is a species of gecko, which is one of the many types of lizard. It is endemic to the Philippines, where it is listed by the IUCN as "least concern," presumably because populations are currently stable; this gecko is fairly common in the forests of Polillo Island, however, it is quite difficult to find in most other areas.
