= Leyte diminutive false gecko =

Scientific classification
- Kingdom: Animalia
- Phylum: Chordata
- Class: Reptilia
- Order: Squamata
- Suborder: Gekkota
- Family: Gekkonidae
- Genus: Pseudogekko
- Species: P. ditoy

Binomial name
- Pseudogekko ditoy Siler, Welton, Davis, Watters, Davey, Diesmos, Diesmos, & Brown, 2014

Species of lizard

The Leyte diminutive false gecko (Pseudogekko ditoy) is a species of gecko. It is endemic to the Philippines.
