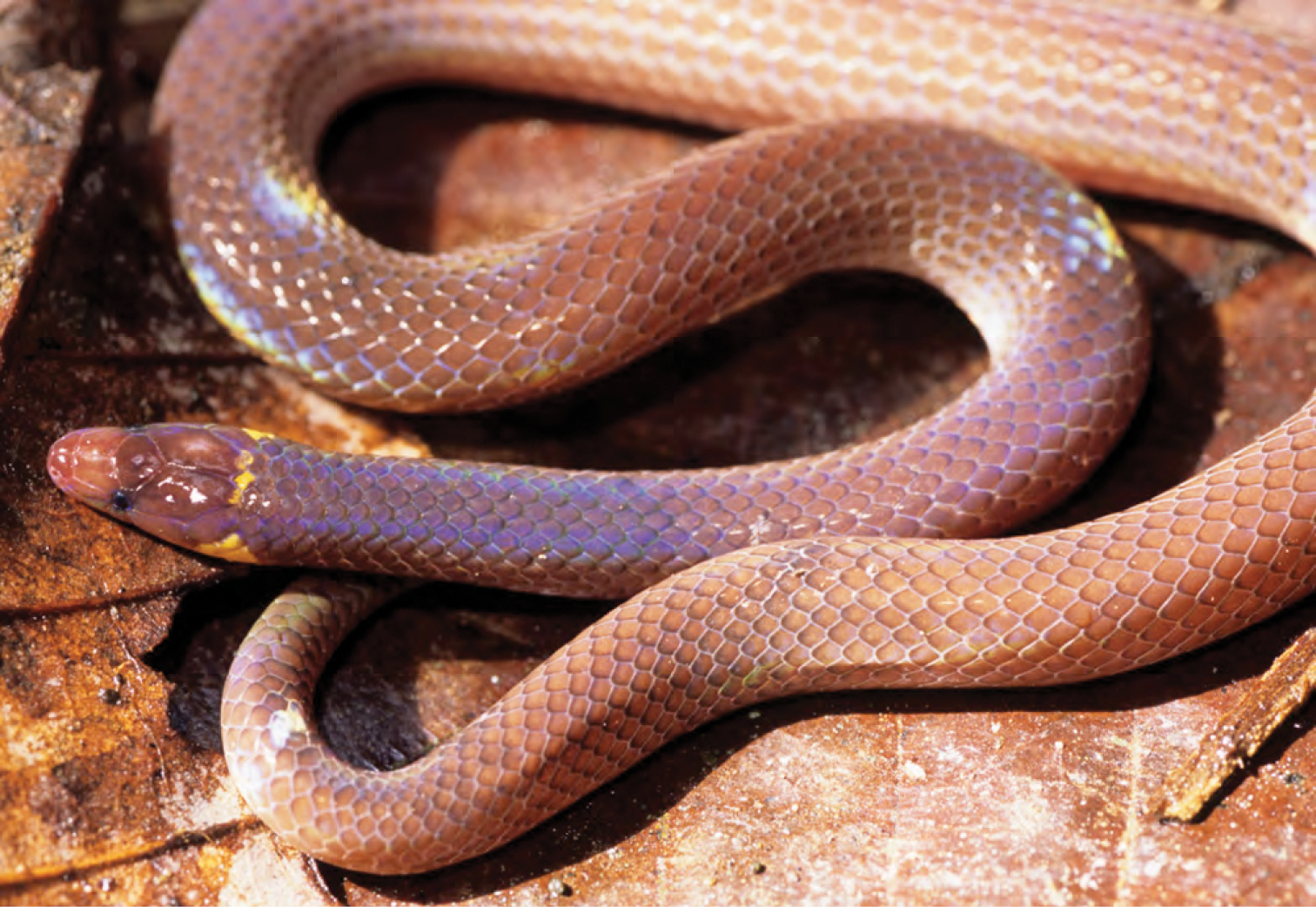

Conservation status
- Least Concern (IUCN 3.1)

Scientific classification
- Kingdom: Animalia
- Phylum: Chordata
- Class: Reptilia
- Order: Squamata
- Suborder: Serpentes
- Family: Colubridae
- Genus: Pseudorabdion
- Species: P. mcnamarae

Binomial name
- Pseudorabdion mcnamarae (Taylor, 1917)

Synonyms
- Pseudorhabdium mcnamarae Taylor, 1917; Pseudorhabdium minutum Taylor, 1922; Pseudorabdion mcnamarae — Leviton & W.C. Brown, 1959

= Pseudorabdion mcnamarae =

Species of snake

Pseudorabdion mcnamarae, also known commonly as McNamara's burrowing snake, is a species of snake in the subfamily Calamariinae of the family Colubridae. The species is endemic to the Philippines.

== Etymology ==
The specific name, mcnamarae, is in honor of Homer McNamara who was superintendent of La Carlota Agricultural Station, Philippines, and assisted Taylor in the field.

== Geographic distribution ==
In the Philippines, Pseudorabdion mcnamarae is found on the islands of Biliran, Cebu, Masbate, Negros, Panay, Sibuyan, and Tablas.

== Habitat ==
Pseudorabdion mcnamarae inhabits primary and secondary forests, at elevations of 200–1,600 m (660–5,250 ft), where it occurs under rotting leaves on the forest floor.

== Behavior ==
Pseudorabdion mcnamarae is terrestrial and semi-fossorial.

== Diet ==
Pseudorabdion mcnamarae preys predominately upon worms.

== Reproduction ==
Pseudorabdion mcnamarae is oviparous.
