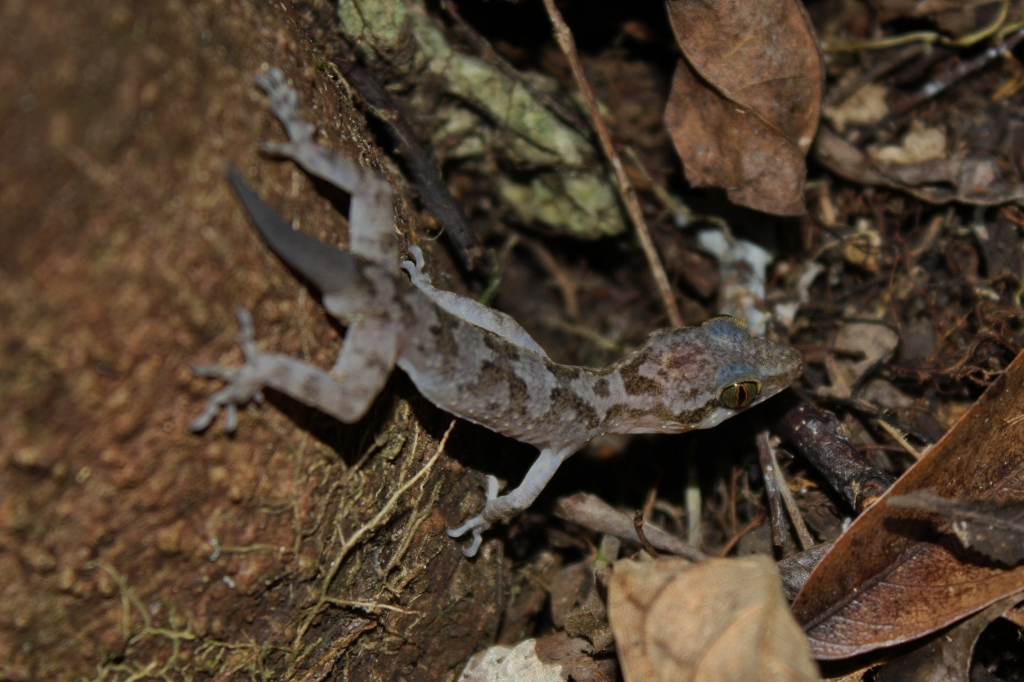

Conservation status
- Least Concern (IUCN 3.1)

Scientific classification
- Kingdom: Animalia
- Phylum: Chordata
- Class: Reptilia
- Order: Squamata
- Suborder: Gekkota
- Family: Gekkonidae
- Genus: Cyrtodactylus
- Species: C. annulatus

Binomial name
- Cyrtodactylus annulatus (Taylor, 1915)
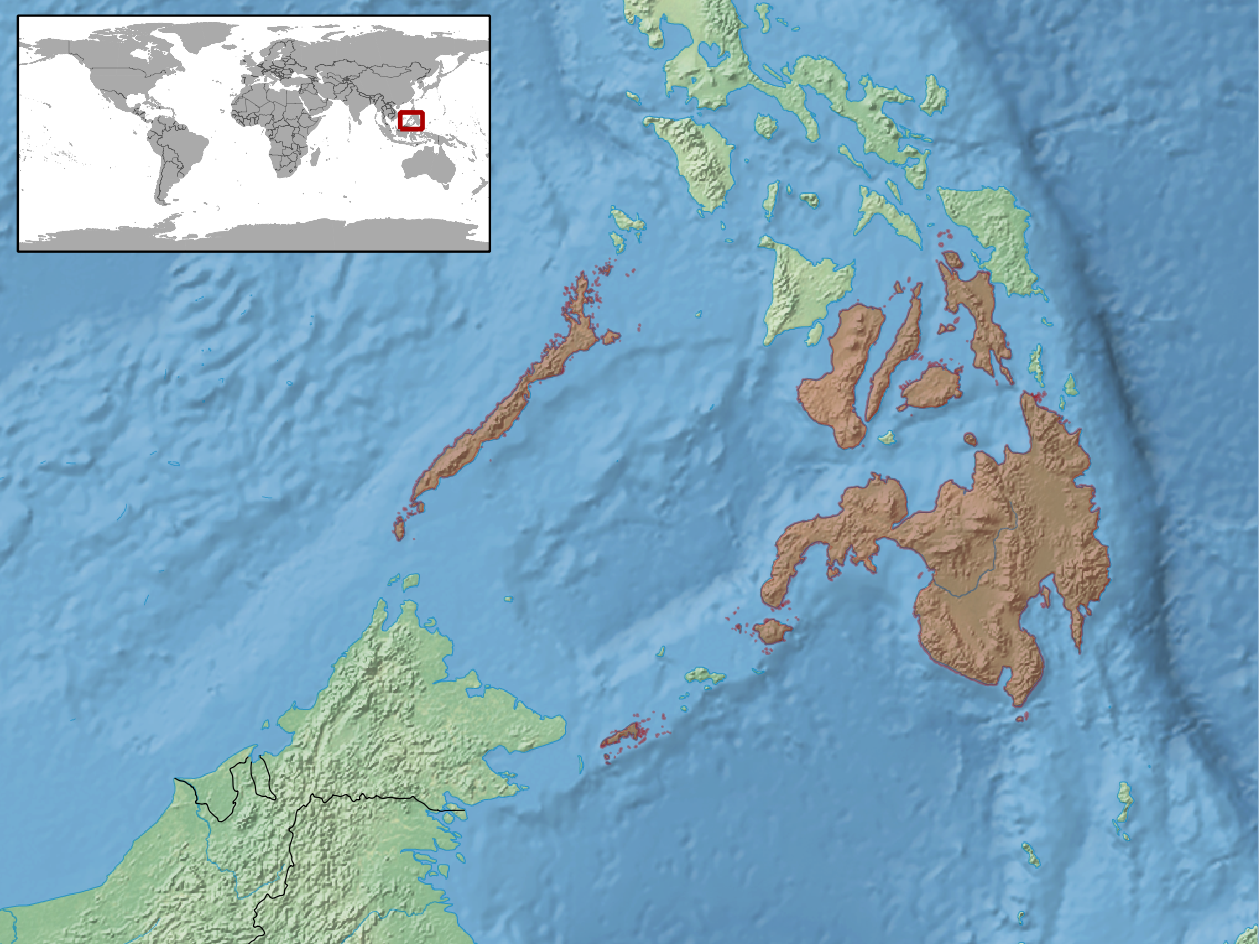

Synonyms
- Gymnodactylus annulatus Taylor, 1915

= Cyrtodactylus annulatus =

Species of lizard

Cyrtodactylus annulatus, also known as the annulated bow-fingered gecko or small bent-toed gecko, is a species of gecko endemic to the Philippines.
