= Central Visayan false gecko =

Scientific classification
- Kingdom: Animalia
- Phylum: Chordata
- Class: Reptilia
- Order: Squamata
- Suborder: Gekkota
- Family: Gekkonidae
- Genus: Pseudogekko
- Species: P. atiorum

Binomial name
- Pseudogekko atiorum Davis, Watters, Köhler, Whitsett, Huron, Brown, Diesmos & Siler, 2015

Species of lizard

The Central Visayan false gecko (Pseudogekko atiorum) is a species of gecko. It is endemic to the Philippines.

The scientific name was chosen to honor the Ati people, a Negrito ethnic group thought to be the aboriginal inhabitants of the Philippines.
