= Fedor Jagor =

German ethnologist, naturalist and explorer

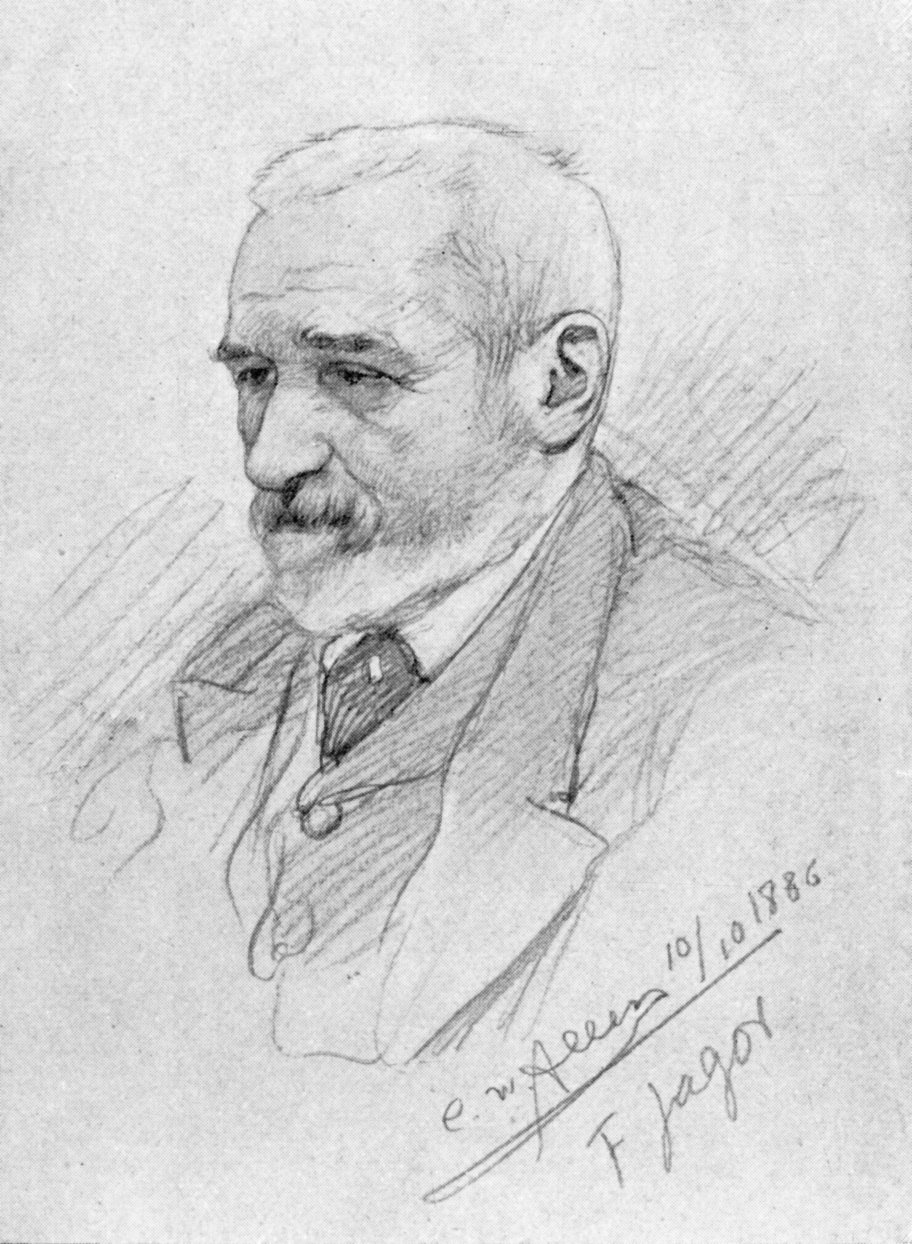
- Born: 30 November 1816
- Died: 11 February 1900 (aged 83)
- Resting place: Southwest Cemetery in Stahnsdorf
- Occupations: Ethnologist, naturalist and explorer

Andreas Fedor Jagor (30 November 1816 – 11 February 1900) was a German ethnologist, naturalist and explorer who traveled throughout Asia in the second half of the 19th century collecting for Berlin museums.

== Life and work ==
Fedor Jagor dealt with ethnography inspired by a visit to Paris. On behalf of the Museum für Naturkunde (Museum of Natural History) in Berlin, he traveled extensively to South and Southeast Asia collecting for the museum. From 1857 to 1861, he was in India, East Asia, including Burma, and the Pacific Islands. He stayed on the island of Java and the rest of the Indonesian archipelago from 1873 to 1876 and from 1890 to 1893.

Since 1869, Jagor had been a member of the Berlin Society for Anthropology, Ethnology and Prehistory (Berliner Gesellschaft für Anthropologie, Ethnologie und Urgeschichte), and on January 9, 1879, he became a member of the German Academy of Sciences Leopoldina.

Jagor maintained an extensive correspondence with Rudolf Virchow and recorded his own travel experiences and observations in several books. He bequeathed his ethnographic collections, including 700 paper negatives of photographs, to the Ethnological Museum of Berlin. His fortune and art collection were donated to the city of Berlin. Following a reburial, his tomb is located at Stahnsdorf South-Western Cemetery.

== Writings (selection) ==
- "Singapore, Malacca, Java: Travel Sketches" Singapore, Malacca, Java: Reiseskizzen. J. Springer, Berlin 1866
- Travels in the Philippines. London: Chapman and Hall. 1875.
- "East Indian trade with regard to the European labor market" Ostindisches Handwerk und Gewerbe mit Rücksicht auf den europäischen Arbeitsmarkt. J. Springer, Berlin 1878
- Jagor, Fedor; et al. (2007). The Former Philippines Through Foreign Eyes (reprint ed.). Echo Library. ISBN 978-1406815429.
- Jagor, Fedor; et al. (2007). The Former Philippines Thru Foreign Eyes. Echo Library. ISBN 978-1406847406.

== Animals named after Jagor ==
- Jagor's sphenomorphus, Pinoyscincus jagori W. Peters, 1864
- Water snake, Enhydris jagorii W. Peters, 1863
- Greater Musky Fruit Bat, Ptenochirus jagori W. Peters, 1861
- Peters' Trumpet-eared Bat, Phoniscus jagorii W. Peters, 1866
- Late Devonian rhenanid placoderm, Jagorina pandora O. Jaekel, 1921
