= Pseudorabdion oxycephalum =

Conservation status
- Least Concern (IUCN 3.1)

Scientific classification
- Kingdom: Animalia
- Phylum: Chordata
- Class: Reptilia
- Order: Squamata
- Suborder: Serpentes
- Family: Colubridae
- Genus: Pseudorabdion
- Species: P. oxycephalum

Binomial name
- Pseudorabdion oxycephalum (Günther, 1858)

Species of snake

Pseudorabdion oxycephalum, Günther's dwarf reed snake or Negros light-scaled burrowing snake, is a species of snake in the family Colubridae. The species is found in the Philippines.
