= Malayotyphlops hypogius =

Conservation status
- Data Deficient (IUCN 3.1)

Scientific classification
- Kingdom: Animalia
- Phylum: Chordata
- Class: Reptilia
- Order: Squamata
- Suborder: Serpentes
- Family: Typhlopidae
- Genus: Malayotyphlops
- Species: M. hypogius

Binomial name
- Malayotyphlops hypogius (Savage, 1950)

Synonyms
- Typhlops hypogius

Species of snake

Malayotyphlops hypogius, also known as the Cebu blind snake or Cebu Island worm snake, is a species of snake in the Typhlopidae family.
