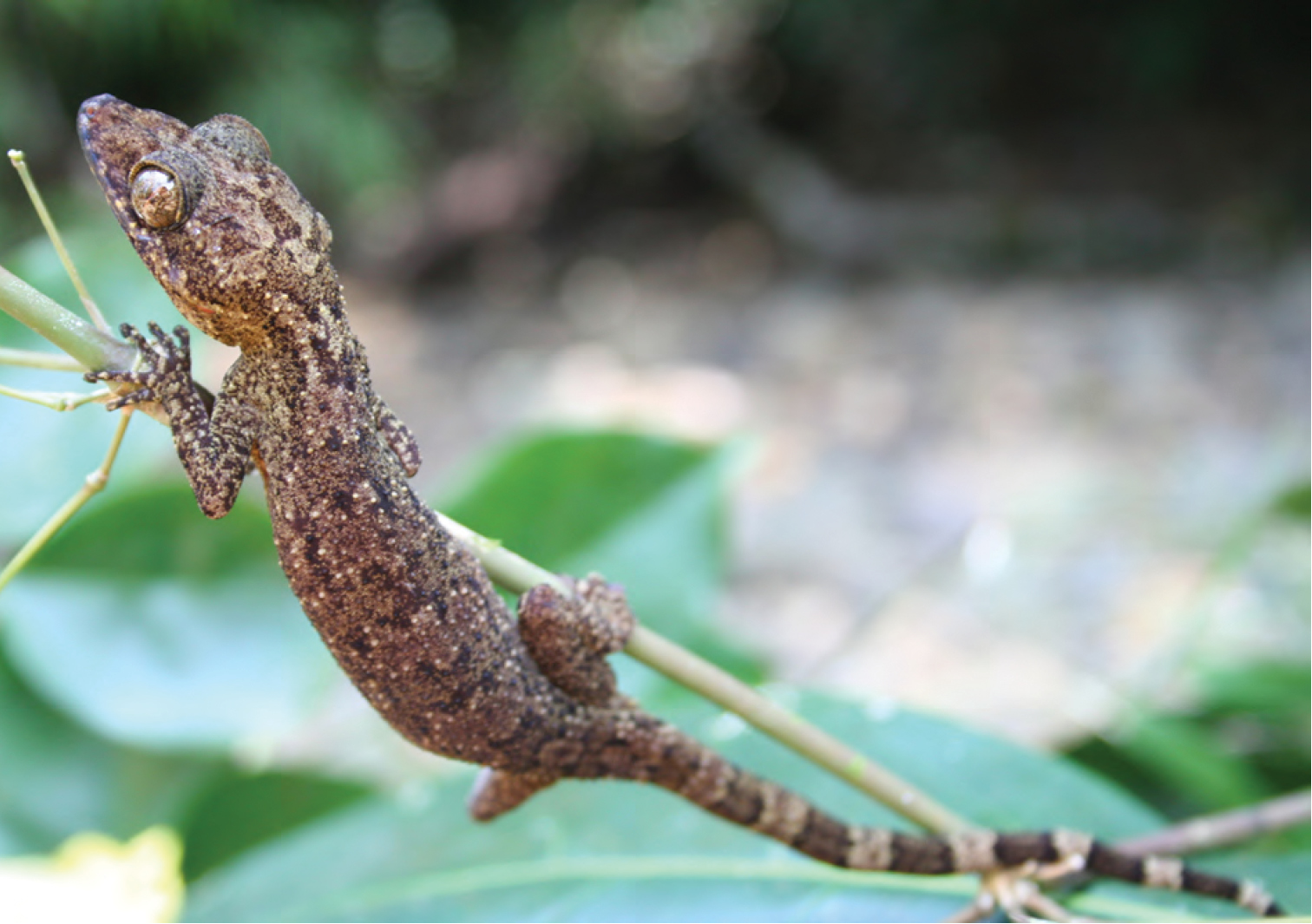
- in Palanan, Isabela, Philippines

Conservation status
- Least Concern (IUCN 3.1)

Scientific classification
- Kingdom: Animalia
- Phylum: Chordata
- Class: Reptilia
- Order: Squamata
- Suborder: Gekkota
- Family: Gekkonidae
- Genus: Cyrtodactylus
- Species: C. philippinicus

Binomial name
- Cyrtodactylus philippinicus (Steindachner, 1867)
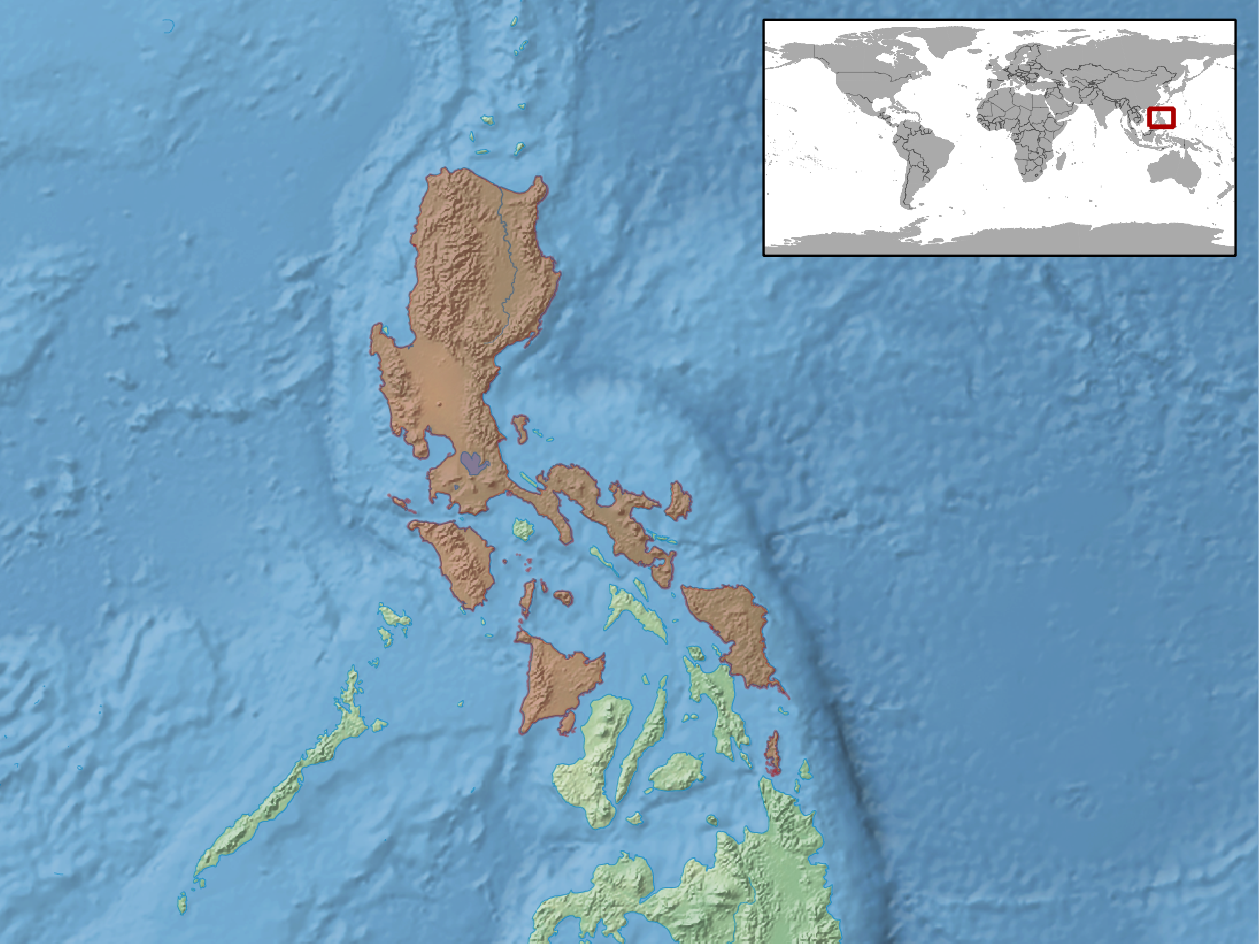
- Distribution of C. philippinicus

Synonyms
- Gonydactylus philippinicus Steindachner, 1867; Gymnodactylus philippinicus (Steindachner, 1867)

= Cyrtodactylus philippinicus =

Species of lizard

Cyrtodactylus philippinicus, commonly known as the Philippine bent-toed gecko or Philippine bow-fingered gecko, is a species of gecko in family Gekkonidae.

== Taxonomy ==
Cyrtodactylus philippinicus was first described by Austrian zoologist Franz Steindachner in 1867. It was named after its distribution in the Philippines. It is commonly known as the Philippine bent-toed gecko or Philippine bow-fingered gecko.

== Distribution and habitat ==
Cyrtodactylus philippinicus is found throughout the northern Philippines. It is common from low- to mid-elevation riparian forests, at elevations of 800 or 900 metres (2,600 or 3,000 ft). Introduced populations exist in Indonesia and Malaysia.

== Behaviour ==
The species is nocturnal, active at night on rocks and boulders, over-hanging stumps and logs, or on root balls of large trees exposed by flowing water.

== Status ==
Cyrtodactylus philippinicus has been evaluated as Least Concern by the IUCN due to its wide distribution, estimated large population, and stable population trend. It is mainly threatened by deforestation.
