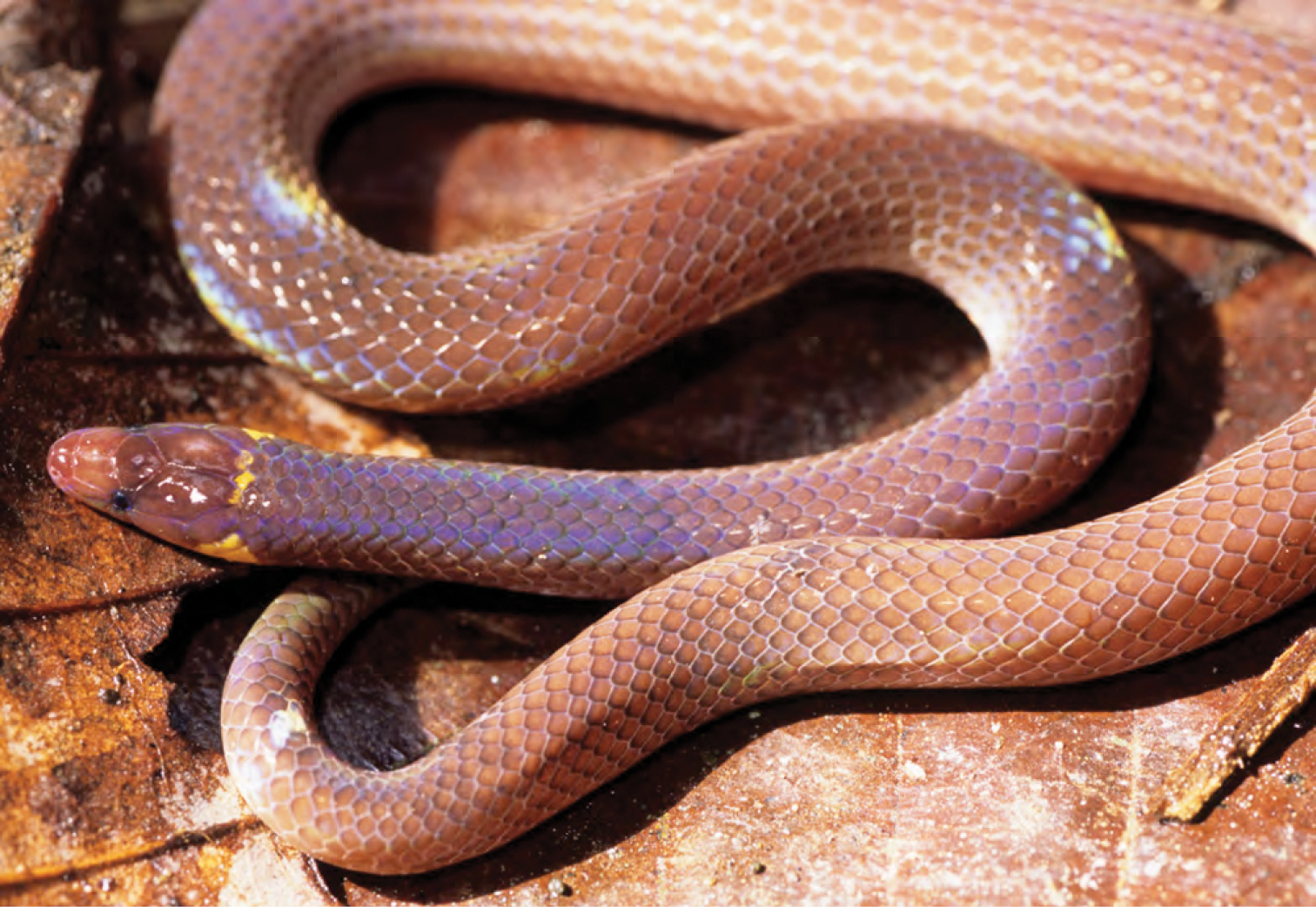
- Pseudorabdion mcnamarae

Scientific classification
- Kingdom: Animalia
- Phylum: Chordata
- Class: Reptilia
- Order: Squamata
- Suborder: Serpentes
- Family: Colubridae
- Subfamily: Calamariinae
- Genus: Pseudorabdion; Jan, 1862

= Pseudorabdion =

Genus of snakes

Pseudorabdion is a genus of snakes of the family Colubridae.

== Geographic range ==
Species in the genus Pseudorabdion are found in Southeast Asia.

== Behavior ==
Several species of Pseudorabdion - P. longiceps, P. saravacense and P. collaris - have been observed rolling or "cartwheeling" to escape danger. Pseudorabdion albonuchalis has also been anecdotally reported to turn cartwheels but this has not been formally documented.

== Species ==
The following 15 species are recognized as being valid.

- Pseudorabdion albonuchalis (Günther, 1896) – white-collared reed snake
- Pseudorabdion ater (Taylor, 1922) – Zamboanga burrowing snake
- Pseudorabdion collaris (Mocquard, 1892) – Mocquard's reed snake, common collared snake
- Pseudorabdion eiselti Inger & Leviton, 1961 – Eiselt's dwarf reed snake
- Pseudorabdion longiceps (Cantor, 1847) – dwarf reed snake, Cantor's dwarf reed snake
- Pseudorabdion mcnamarae (Taylor, 1917) – McNamara's burrowing snake
- Pseudorabdion modiglianii Giu. Doria & Petri, 2010 – Modigliani's dwarf reed snake
- Pseudorabdion montanum Leviton & W.C. Brown, 1959 – mountain burrowing snake
- Pseudorabdion oxycephalum (Günther, 1858) – Günther's dwarf reed snake, Negros light-scaled burrowing snake
- Pseudorabdion sarasinorum (F. Müller, 1895) – Sarasin's reed snake
- Pseudorabdion saravacense (Shelford, 1901)
- Pseudorabdion sirambense Doria & Petri, 2010 – Sirambé dwarf reed snake
- Pseudorabdion talonuran R.M. Brown, Leviton & Sison, 1999 – Panay Island reed snake
- Pseudorabdion taylori Leviton & W.C. Brown, 1959 – Taylor's burrowing snake
- Pseudorabdion torquatum A.M.C. Duméril, Bibron & A.H.A. Duméril, 1854

Nota bene: A binomial authority in parentheses indicates that the species was originally described in a genus other than Pseudorabdion.
