= Zamboanga false gecko =

Conservation status
- Data Deficient (IUCN 3.1)

Scientific classification
- Kingdom: Animalia
- Phylum: Chordata
- Class: Reptilia
- Order: Squamata
- Suborder: Gekkota
- Family: Gekkonidae
- Genus: Pseudogekko
- Species: P. chavacano

Binomial name
- Pseudogekko chavacano Siler, Welton, Davis, Watters, Davey, Diesmos, Diesmos & Brown, 2014

Species of lizard

The Zamboanga false gecko (Pseudogekko chavacano) is a species of gecko. It is endemic to the Philippines.
