= Joint snake =

Mythical creature from American folklore

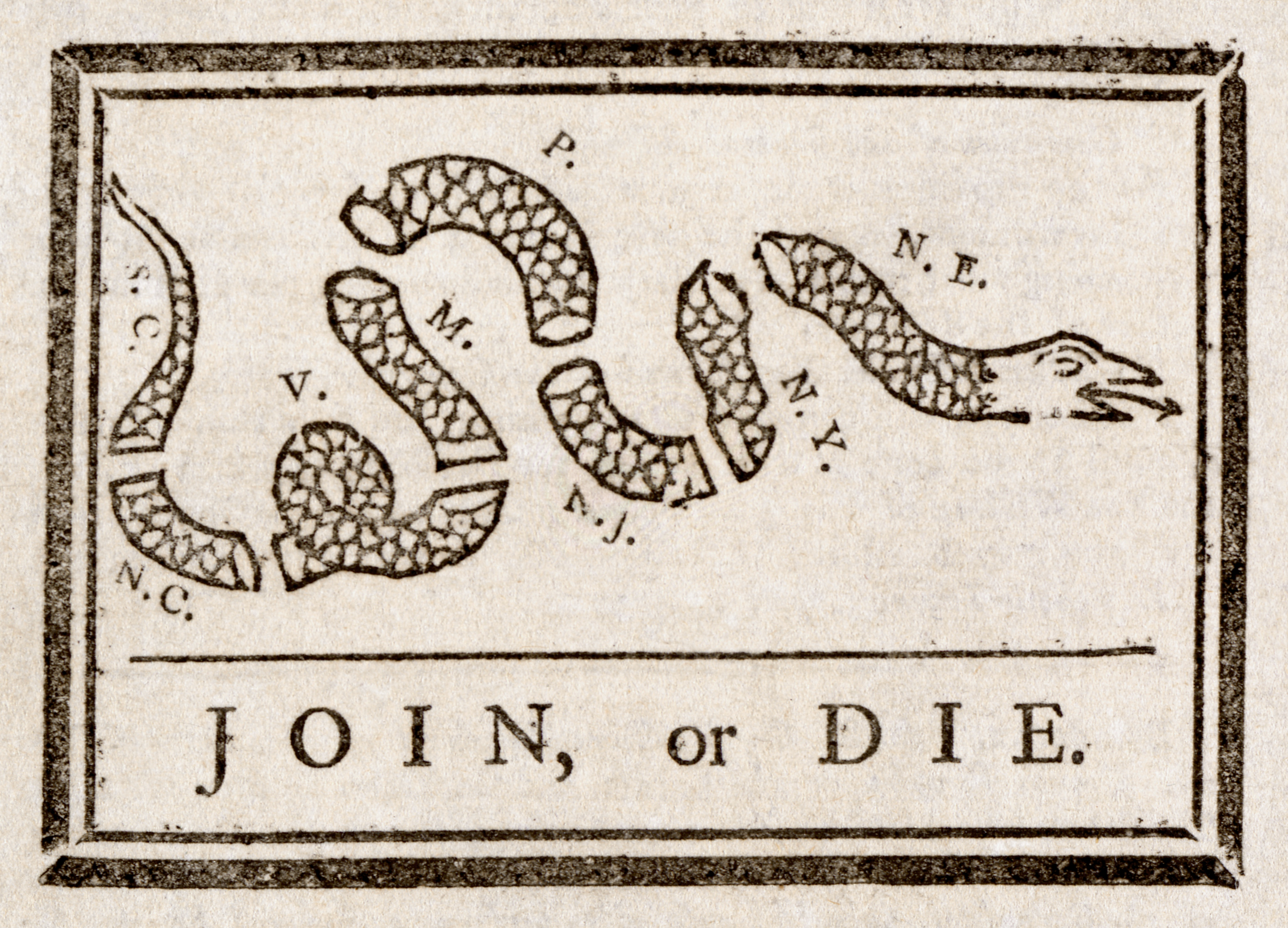
A joint snake symbolizes the American colonies in Benjamin Franklin's 1754 political cartoon, Join, or Die.

A joint snake is a legendary creature of the Southern United States, the myth likely having spread elsewhere. Supposedly, the joint snake can break itself (or be cut) into pieces and will reassemble itself. It is said that if a piece of the snake is taken and the pocket knife used to cut the snake is set down in the place of the snake's piece, the knife will join up with the whole of the snake.

According to travelers' accounts, their skin is as hard as parchment and as smooth as glass. It is so stiff that it can hardly bend itself. When it is struck it breaks, and you may, with a whip, break it from the tail to the bowels into pieces not an inch long, and not produce the least tincture of blood.

== Explanations ==
Mistaken identity is probably responsible for the myth that some snakes can magically break apart and reconnect the pieces like a puzzle. It's physically impossible for any snake to do so and live, but another type of reptile comes close. Lizards are able to cast off body parts when under attack, then regrow them. One species of lizard has a long, snakelike body and no legs. These legless lizards are commonly called "glass snakes" or "joint snakes," even though they are not snakes at all. The tail is often twice the length of the head and body together. When the reptile is struck lightly, the portion which seemingly is voluntary broken to pieces is always the tail, never the body. To the lizard the fragile tail is a benefit rather than a misfortune, for when the defenseless reptile is seized by a rapacious animal it snaps off its tail in pieces, while the head and body, the vital parts, wriggle away and escape. However, it has the power to replace the lost member, not by pasting or cementing together the old broken portions, but by rapidly growing a new one. The snake lizard, which is not venomous, has been found in all of the Southern States from Southern Virginia to Texas inclusive; and in the West the range extends as far north as Wisconsin and Iowa. It seems to prefer open fields and dry or sandy localities.
