= Rafe Marion Brown =

American herpetologist and conservationist

- Born: October 1, 1968
- Education: Reed College, Miami University, University of Texas at Austin
- Known for: Research on the herpetofauna of the Philippines and Southeast Asia
- Scientific career
- Fields: Herpetology, Conservation biology
- Workplaces: University of Kansas
- Doctoral advisor: David C. Cannatella

Rafe Marion Brown (born October 1, 1968) is an American herpetologist and conservationist. His research focuses on the herpetofauna of the Philippines, Southeast Asia, and the western Pacific.

== Biography ==
Brown is the son of Walter and Lucia Brown (née Hopple). After graduating from the Putney School in Putney, Vermont, he enrolled at Reed College in Portland, Oregon. In 1991 he transferred to Miami University in Oxford, Ohio, where he earned a Bachelor of Arts in May 1994 and a Master of Science in May 1997. In September 1997, Brown entered the University of Texas at Austin, where he completed his Ph.D. in May 2004 under the supervision of David C. Cannatella. His dissertation, titled Evolution of Ecomorphological Variation and Acoustic Diversity in Mate-Recognition Signals of Southeast Asian Forest Frogs (subfamily Platymantinae), examined the diversification of mate-recognition signals among forest frogs of Southeast Asia. Since January 2005, he has served as curator-in-charge at the Biodiversity Institute of the University of Kansas in Lawrence.

Brown uses molecular markers combined with statistical methods to test hypotheses regarding species boundaries, distribution, dispersal, isolation, and diversity. His empirical research emphasizes patterns of lineage diversification and species-level responses to biogeographic processes across island archipelagos. He conducts most of his fieldwork in the Philippines, Indonesia, and the Solomon Islands, applying a comparative, multi-taxon approach to the biogeography of terrestrial vertebrates. Brown is also active in biodiversity and taxonomy studies and works toward the conservation of amphibians and reptiles in Southeast Asia.

Brown has co-described approximately 70 species of reptiles, including species from the genera Brachymeles, Calliophis, Cyrtodactylus, Draco, Gekko, Hemiphyllodactylus, Luperosaurus, Malayotyphlops, Parvoscincus, Pseudogekko, and Varanus.

== Eponyms ==
In 2007, the frog species Platymantis paengi was named in honor of Rafe M. Brown. The species epithet paengi derives from “Paeng,” a common Tagalog nickname for persons named Rafael.

== Taxa described ==
- Acutotyphlops banaorum Wallach, Brown, Diesmos & Gee, 2007
- Brachymeles bicolandia Siler, Fuiten, Jones, Alcala & Brown, 2011
- Brachymeles brevidactylus Siler, Fuiten, Jones, Alcala & Brown, 2011
- Brachymeles cobos Siler, Fuiten, Jones, Alcala & Brown, 2011
- Brachymeles kadwa Siler & Brown, 2010
- Brachymeles libayani Siler, Fuiten, Jones, Alcala & Brown, 2011
- Brachymeles lukbani Siler, Balete, Diesmos & Brown, 2010
- Brachymeles makusog Siler, Diesmos & Brown, 2010
- Brachymeles muntingkamay Siler, Rico, Duya & Brown, 2009
- Brachymeles paeforum Siler, Fuiten, Jones, Alcala & Brown, 2011
- Brachymeles samad Siler, Jones, Diesmos, Diesmos & Brown, 2012
- Brachymeles tiboliorum Siler, Jones, Diesmos, Diesmos & Brown, 2012
- Brachymeles tungaoi Siler & Brown, 2010
- Brachymeles vindumi Siler & Brown, 2010
- Brachymeles vulcani Siler, Jones, Diesmos, Diesmos & Brown, 2012
- Cyrtodactylus gubaot Welton, Siler, Linkem, Diesmos & Brown, 2010
- Cyrtodactylus jambangan Welton, Siler, Diesmos & Brown, 2010
- Cyrtodactylus mamanwa Welton, Siler, Linkem, Diesmos & Brown, 2010
- Cyrtodactylus spinosus Linkem, McGuire, Hayden, Setiadi, Bickford & Brown, 2008
- Cyrtodactylus sumuroi Welton, Siler, Linkem, Diesmos & Brown, 2010
- Cyrtodactylus tautbatorum Welton, Siler, Diesmos & Brown, 2009
- Cyrtodactylus wallacei Hayden, Brown, Gillespie, Setiadi, Linkem, Iskandar, Umilaela, Bickford, Riyanto, Mumpuni & McGuire, 2008
- Draco iskandari McGuire, Brown, Mumpuni, Riyanto & Andayani, 2007
- Draco supriatnai McGuire, Brown, Mumpuni, Riyanto & Andayani, 2007
- Gekko carusadensis Linkem, Siler, Diesmos, Sy & Brown, 2010
- Gekko coi Brown, Siler, Oliveros, Diesmos & Alcala, 2011
- Gekko crombota Brown, Oliveros, Siler & Diesmos, 2011
- Gekko ernstkelleri Rösler, Siler, Brown, Demegillo & Gaulke, 2006
- Gekko rossi Brown, Oliveros, Siler & Diesmos, 2009
- Hologerrhum dermali Brown, Leviton, Ferner & Sison, 2001
- Hylarana mangyanum (Brown & Guttman, 2002)
- Insulasaurus traanorum (Linkem, Diesmos & Brown, 1980)
- Leptobrachium lumadorum Brown, Siler, Diesmos & Alcala, 2010
- Leptobrachium mangyanorum Brown, Siler, Diesmos & Alcala, 2010
- Leptobrachium tagbanorum Brown, Siler, Diesmos & Alcala, 2010
- Limnonectes ferneri Siler, McVay, Diesmos & Brown, 2009
- Luperosaurus angliit Brown, Diesmos & Oliveros, 2011
- Luperosaurus corfieldi Gaulke, Rösler & Brown, 2007
- Luperosaurus gulat Brown, Diesmos, Duya, Garcia & Rico, 2010
- Luperosaurus iskandari Brown, Supriatna & Ota, 2000
- Luperosaurus kubli Brown, Diesmos & Duya, 2007
- Parvoscincus Ferner, Brown & Greer, 1997
- Parvoscincus boyingi (Brown, Linkem, Diesmos, Balete, Duya & Ferner, 2010)
- Parvoscincus hadros (Brown, Linkem, Diesmos, Balete, Duya & Ferner, 2010)
- Parvoscincus igorotorum (Brown, Linkem, Diesmos, Balete, Duya & Ferner, 2010)
- Parvoscincus sisoni Ferner, Brown & Greer, 1997
- Parvoscincus tagapayo (Brown, McGuire, Ferner & Alcala, 1999)
- Pinoyscincus Linkem, Diesmos & Brown, 2011
- Platymantis adiastolus Brown, Richards, Sukumaran & Foufopoulos, 2006
- Platymantis bayani Siler, Alcala, Diesmos & Brown, 2009
- Platymantis biak Siler, Diesmos, Linkem, Diesmos & Brown, 2010
- Platymantis citrinospilus Brown, Richards & Broadhead, 2013
- Platymantis desticans Brown & Richards, 2008
- Platymantis diesmosi Brown & Gonzalez, 2007
- Platymantis isarog Brown, Brown, Alcala & Frost, 1997
- Platymantis mamusiorum Foufopoulos & Brown, 2004
- Platymantis nakanaiorum Brown, Foufopoulos & Richards, 2006
- Platymantis panayensis Brown, Brown & Alcala, 1997
- Platymantis parilis Brown & Richards, 2008
- Pseudorabdion talonuran Brown, Leviton & Sison, 1999
- Ptychozoon trinotaterra Brown, 1999
- Sanguirana aurantipunctata Fuiten, Welton, Diesmos, Barley, Oberheide, Duya, Rico & Brown, 2011
- Tytthoscincus Linkem, Diesmos & Brown, 2011
- Varanus bitatawa Welton, Siler, Bennett, Diesmos, Duya, Dugay, Rico, van Weerd & Brown, 2010
