= Brachymeles tungaoi =

Tungao's slender skink

Scientific classification
- Kingdom: Animalia
- Phylum: Chordata
- Class: Reptilia
- Order: Squamata
- Family: Scincidae
- Genus: Brachymeles
- Species: B. tungaoi

Binomial name
- Brachymeles tungaoi Siler & Brown, 2010

Species of lizard

Brachymeles tungaoi, or the Tungao's slender skink, is a species of skinks in the Scincidae family endemic to the island province of Masbate in the Philippines. The species is most closely allied to other Brachymeles species such as B. kadwa, B. makusog, B. talinis, and B. vindumi. However, it can be distinguished from all these congeners by its smaller body size, narrower midbody, greater relative tail length, the first two pairs of chin shields equalling in width, and contact between the first pairs of chin shields. The species is assessed as Least Concern in the IUCN Red List of Threatened Species, with its population trend remaining stable.

== Distribution ==
This species is endemic on the island of Masbate in the Philippines.

== Habitat ==
The species is semi-fossorial. It was found in dry, decaying material inside or underneath logs, within forest-floor detritus, and among the leaf litter of lowland forests.

== Etymology ==
This species is named in honor of Jason B. "Tungao" Fernandez.
