= Graceful short-legged skink =

There are three species of skink named graceful short-legged skink endemic to the Philippines:

- Brachymeles gracilis
- Brachymeles hilong
- Brachymeles suluensis
