= Taylor's short-legged skink =

There are two species of skink named Taylor's short-legged skink endemic to the Philippines:

- Brachymeles taylori
- Brachymeles vermis
