= Brachymeles cebuensis =

Rabor's short-legged skink

Conservation status
- Vulnerable (IUCN 3.1)

Scientific classification
- Kingdom: Animalia
- Phylum: Chordata
- Class: Reptilia
- Order: Squamata
- Family: Scincidae
- Genus: Brachymeles
- Species: B. cebuensis

Binomial name
- Brachymeles cebuensis Brown & Rabor, 1967

Species of lizard

Brachymeles cebuensis, commonly known as Rabor's short-legged skink or Cebu small worm skink is a species of skink endemic to Cebu, Philippines.
