= Cyrtodactylus meersi =

Scientific classification
- Kingdom: Animalia
- Phylum: Chordata
- Class: Reptilia
- Order: Squamata
- Suborder: Gekkota
- Family: Gekkonidae
- Genus: Cyrtodactylus
- Species: C. meersi

Binomial name
- Cyrtodactylus meersi L. Grismer, Wood, Quah, Murdoch, M. Grismer, Herr, Espinoza, R.M. Brown & Lin, 2018

Species of lizard

Cyrtodactylus meersi, also known commonly as the Bago Yoma bent-toed gecko, is a species of lizard in the family Gekkonidae. The species is endemic to Myanmar.

== Etymology ==
The specific name, meersi, is in honor of John Meers for his support of karst biology research in Southeast Asia.

== Geographic range ==
C. meersi is found in Bago Region, Myanmar.

== Description ==
The adult size of C. meersi is unknown. The species was described from a single juvenile specimen, the holotype.

== Reproduction ==
The mode of reproduction of C. meersi is unknown.
