= Brachymeles boholensis =

Bohol short-legged skink

Conservation status
- Least Concern (IUCN 3.1)

Scientific classification
- Kingdom: Animalia
- Phylum: Chordata
- Class: Reptilia
- Order: Squamata
- Suborder: Scinciformata
- Infraorder: Scincomorpha
- Family: Scincidae
- Genus: Brachymeles
- Species: B. boholensis

Binomial name
- Brachymeles boholensis Brown & Rabor, 1967

Species of lizard

Brachymeles boholensis, the Bohol short-legged skink, is a species of skink endemic to the Philippines.
