= Brachymeles boulengeri =

Boulenger's short-legged skink

Conservation status
- Least Concern (IUCN 3.1)

Scientific classification
- Kingdom: Animalia
- Phylum: Chordata
- Class: Reptilia
- Order: Squamata
- Family: Scincidae
- Genus: Brachymeles
- Species: B. boulengeri

Binomial name
- Brachymeles boulengeri Taylor, 1922
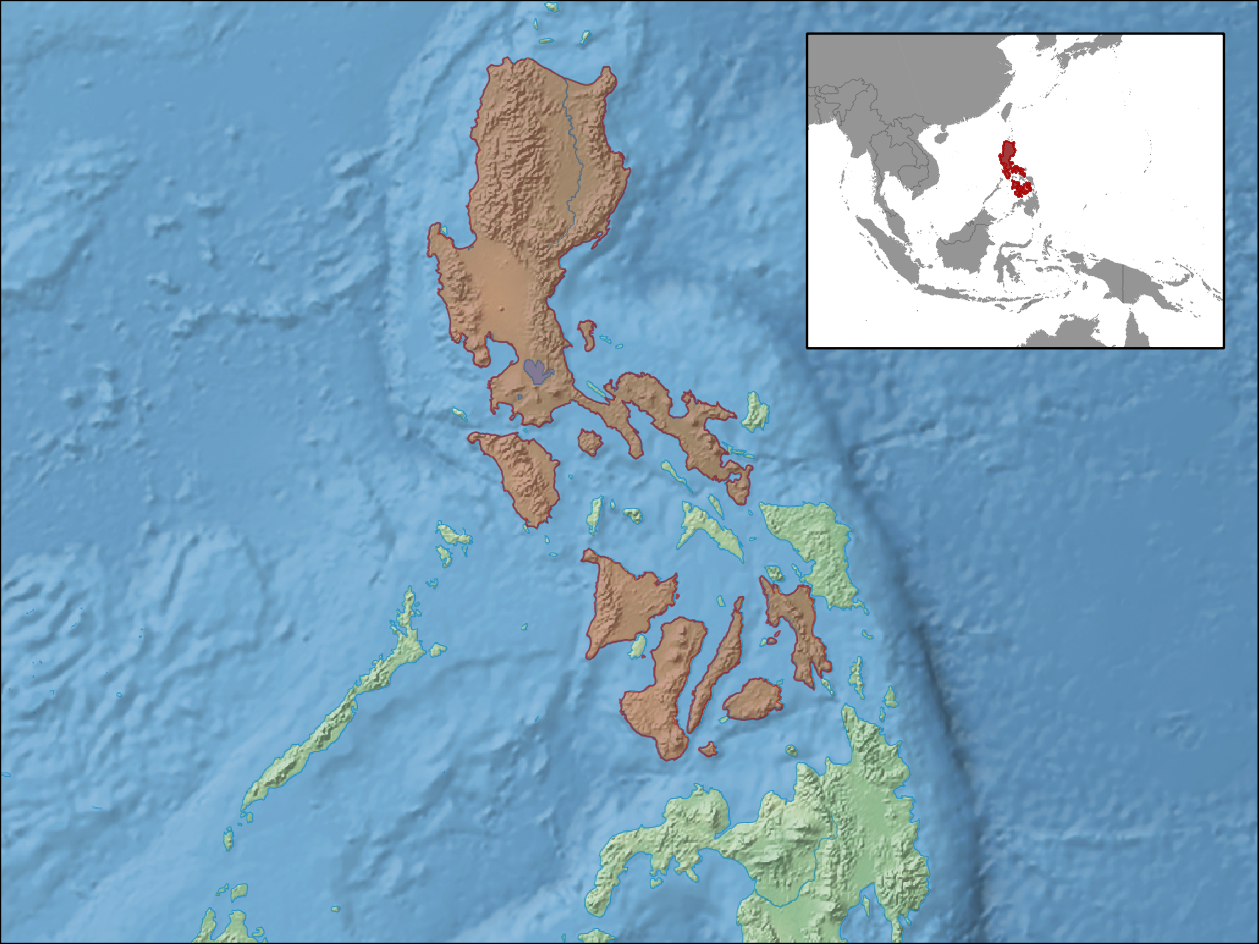

Synonyms
- Brachymeles boulengeri Taylor, 1922; Brachymeles gracilis boulengeri — W.C. Brown & Rabor, 1967; Brachymeles boulengeri — W.C. Brown & Alcala, 1980

Species of lizard

Brachymeles boulengeri, Boulenger's short-legged skink, is a species of lizard in the family Scincidae. The species is endemic to the Philippines.

== Etymology ==
The specific name, boulengeri, is in honor of Belgian-born British herpetologist George Albert Boulenger.

== Geographic range ==
In the Philippines, B. boulengeri is found in Bohol, Luzon, Mindoro, Panay, Polillo, and Visayas.

== Habitat ==
The preferred natural habitat of B. boulengeri is forest, at altitudes from sea level to 1,200 m (3,900 ft).

== Description ==
The holotype of B. boulengeri has a snout-to-vent length of 7.5 cm (3.0 in) and a tail length of 9 cm (3.5 in). Dorsally, it is brown; ventrally, it is yellow-brown. All four legs are small, each with five toes.

== Behavior ==
B. boulengeri is terrestrial and fossorial, living in leaf litter and under rotten logs.

== Reproduction ==
B. boulengeri is viviparous.
