= Brachymeles burksi =

Conservation status
- Least Concern (IUCN 3.1)

Scientific classification
- Kingdom: Animalia
- Phylum: Chordata
- Class: Reptilia
- Order: Squamata
- Family: Scincidae
- Genus: Brachymeles
- Species: B. burksi

Binomial name
- Brachymeles burksi Taylor, 1917

Species of lizard

Brachymeles burksi, the Burks' burrowing skink, is a species of skink endemic to the Philippines. It occurs on the islands of Mindoro and Marinduque. It was synonymized with Brachymeles bonitae by Walter C. Brown in 1956 but revalidated by Cameron D. Siler and colleagues in 2020.

Brachymeles burksi measures 58–78 mm (2.3–3.1 in) in snout–vent length. It has short, digitless limbs (many Brachymeles are limbless).
