= Brachymeles mindorensis =

Mindoro short-legged skink

Scientific classification
- Domain: Eukaryota
- Kingdom: Animalia
- Phylum: Chordata
- Class: Reptilia
- Order: Squamata
- Family: Scincidae
- Genus: Brachymeles
- Species: B. mindorensis

Binomial name
- Brachymeles mindorensis (Brown & Rabor, 1967)

Species of lizard

Brachymeles mindorensis, the Mindoro short-legged skink, is a species of skink endemic to the Philippines.
