= Gekko gulat =

Scientific classification
- Kingdom: Animalia
- Phylum: Chordata
- Class: Reptilia
- Order: Squamata
- Suborder: Gekkota
- Family: Gekkonidae
- Genus: Gekko
- Species: G. gulat

Binomial name
- Gekko gulat Brown, Diesmos, Duya, Garcia, & Rico, 2010

Species of lizard

Gekko gulat is a species of gecko. It is endemic to Palawan in the Philippines.
