= Brachymeles ilocandia =

Ilokano slender skink

Conservation status
- Least Concern (IUCN 3.1)

Scientific classification
- Kingdom: Animalia
- Phylum: Chordata
- Class: Reptilia
- Order: Squamata
- Family: Scincidae
- Genus: Brachymeles
- Species: B. ilocandia

Binomial name
- Brachymeles ilocandia Siler, Davis, Freitas, Huron, Geheber, Watters, Penrod, Papes, Amrein, Anwawr, Cooper Hein, Manning, Patel, Pinaroc, Diesmos, Diesmos, Oliveros, & Brown, 2016

Species of lizard

Brachymeles ilocandia, the Ilokano slender skink, is a species of skink endemic to the Philippines.
