= Ross's Calayan gecko =

Scientific classification
- Kingdom: Animalia
- Phylum: Chordata
- Class: Reptilia
- Order: Squamata
- Suborder: Gekkota
- Family: Gekkonidae
- Genus: Gekko
- Species: G. rossi

Binomial name
- Gekko rossi Brown, Oliveros, Siler & Diesmos, 2009

Species of lizard

Ross's Calayan gecko (Gekko rossi) is a species of lizard in the family Gekkonidae. The species is endemic to Calayan Island in the Philippines.

== Etymology ==
The specific name, rossi, is in honor of herpetologist Charles Andrew "Andy" Ross.

== Description ==
Males of G. rossi may attain a snout-to-vent length (SVL) of 10.8 cm (4.3 in). Females are smaller at 10.0 cm (3.9 in) maximum SVL.
