= Insulasaurus victoria =

Conservation status
- Near Threatened (IUCN 3.1)

Scientific classification
- Kingdom: Animalia
- Phylum: Chordata
- Class: Reptilia
- Order: Squamata
- Family: Scincidae
- Genus: Insulasaurus
- Species: I. victoria

Binomial name
- Insulasaurus victoria (Brown & Alcala, 1980)

Synonyms
- Sphenomorphus victoria Brown & Alcala, 1980

Species of lizard

Insulasaurus victoria is a species of skink. It is endemic to Palawan in the Philippines. It measures about 46 mm (1.8 in) in snout–vent length.
