= Gekko coi =

Conservation status
- Least Concern (IUCN 3.1)

Scientific classification
- Kingdom: Animalia
- Phylum: Chordata
- Class: Reptilia
- Order: Squamata
- Suborder: Gekkota
- Family: Gekkonidae
- Genus: Gekko
- Species: G. coi

Binomial name
- Gekko coi R.M. Brown, Siler, Oliveros, Diesmos & Alcala, 2011

Synonyms
- Gekko (Archipelagekko) coi — Wood et al., 2019

Species of lizard

Gekko coi is a species of gecko, a lizard in the family Gekkonidae. The species is endemic to Sibuyan Island in the central Philippines.

== Etymology ==
The specific name, coi, honours Leonard Co, who is a Philippine botanist and conservation biologist.

== Habitat ==
The preferred natural habitat of G. coi is forest, at altitudes from sea level to 900 m (3,000 ft). It has also been found in agricultural areas.

== Description ==
Adults of G. coi have a snout-to-vent length (SVL) of about 6.5–8.5 cm (2.6–3.3 in).

== Behavior ==
G. coi is nocturnal.

== Reproduction ==
G. coi is oviparous.
