= Babuyan Claro gecko =

Scientific classification
- Kingdom: Animalia
- Phylum: Chordata
- Class: Reptilia
- Order: Squamata
- Suborder: Gekkota
- Family: Gekkonidae
- Genus: Gekko
- Species: G. crombota

Binomial name
- Gekko crombota Brown, Oliveros, Siler, & Diesmos, 2008

Species of lizard

The Babuyan Claro gecko (Gekko crombota) is a species of gecko. It is endemic to Babuyan Island in the Philippines.
