= Agustín Sumuroy =

Leader in the Sumuroy Rebellion in the colonial Philippines (1649–50)

- Died: 2 July 1650; Palapag, Northern Samar
- Other name: Juan Sumuroy
- Occupations: Military leader; Fortress commander; Sea pilot

Agustín Sumuroy (also known as Juan Sumuroy) was a Waray rebel leader who led the Sumuroy Revolt, an uprising against Spanish colonial forces in the eastern Visayas from 1649 to 1650. He is widely regarded in local history as a prominent figure of the Palapag rebellion during the Spanish colonial period.

Other key figures in the uprising included Don Juan Ponce and Don Pedro Caamug, who served alongside Sumuroy in leading the rebellion. The name "Juan Ponce Sumuroy" is sometimes erroneously attributed to Agustín, likely due to historical conflation with Don Juan Ponce.

== Sumuroy Revolt (1649–1650) ==
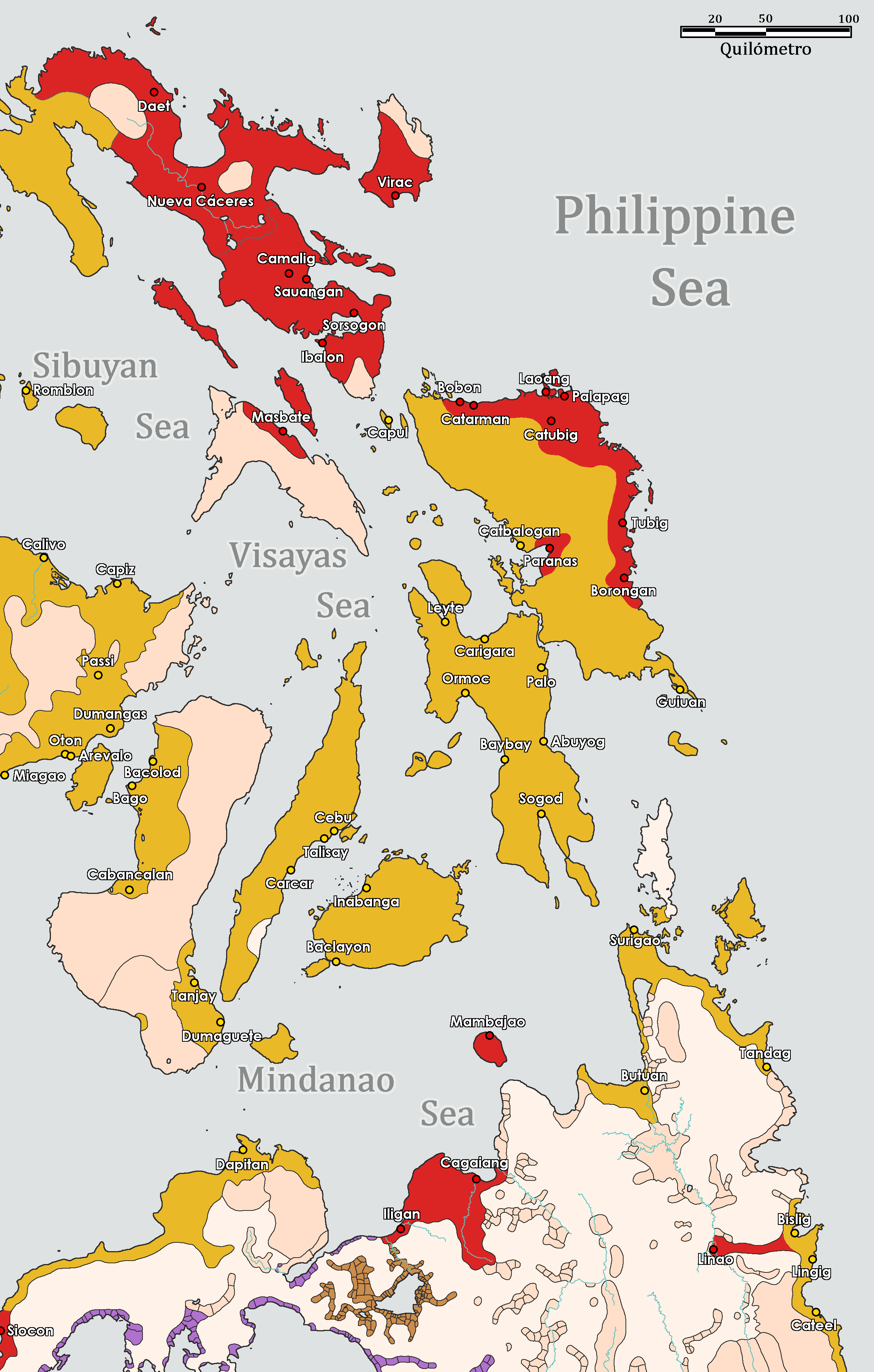
A map of the Sumuroy Revolt at its greatest extent on 7 January 1650, fought between the Spanish East Indies (yellow) and the rebels of Palapag and its allies (red) under the leadership of Agustín Sumuroy.

In 1649, Governor-General Diego Fajardo ordered the conscription of men for labor at the Cavite shipyards. This decree caused widespread resentment, leading the people of Palapag to rebel under the leadership of Sumuroy. The town's parish priest was killed on June 1, 1649, and hostilities escalated the following day with the destruction of the Palapag Church and its furnishings. On June 3, Sumuroy claimed responsibility for the deaths of the friars and the complete destruction of the church. The towns of Palapag and Catubig revolted and rejected Spanish religious authority, followed by the towns of Pambujan, Bayugo, Catarman, and Bonan.

By June, the revolt had spread to Albay and Camarines. In Masbate, rebels killed the local friar, Father Alférez Torres. In Caraga, the town of Tinao (or Linao, in inner Agusan) revolted and killed the resident Augustinian friar. The town of Iligan also revolted, followed by the Manobo of Cagayan de Oro. An attempted revolt in Cebu was quickly suppressed by colonial authorities. In Leyte, residents of the town of Bacor (Bacol) abandoned their town to join the rebels in Palapag. While Bohol remained loyal to the Spanish colonial government, the people of Paranas subsequently rebelled.

In October, Spanish forces returned to Palapag. The rebels positioned themselves on a hill known as "Palapag Mesa" or "Bubuyaon." On October 11, the rebel leader Pedro Caamug descended from the hill fort, and his forces killed Vicente Damián in Palapag.

Subsequently, the Commander of the Galleys, Andrés López de Asaldigui, sailed from Manila to Catbalogan, Samar, with Spanish and Kapampangan forces. Upon arrival, he dispatched thirteen ships to Panay and Iloilo to secure provisions for the campaign. The Zamboanga naval forces contributed four karakoa and 400 Lutao warriors. Additional soldiers were deployed from Sialo, Caraga, and other towns. These forces consolidated in Catbalogan and were divided into three divisions: two under the command of Sandoval and de León, and one under de Rojas. Sandoval was assigned to Catubig and Palapag, de León to Tubig, Sulat, Borongan, and Guiguan, and de Rojas to Catarman and Bobon.

The following year, on January 7, 1650, revolts also broke out in Camiguin and among the Subanon in Siocon, resulting in the death of Father Juan del Campo.

In May 1650, the Spanish offensive to suppress the rebellion began. In Paranas, Captain de León defeated Waray forces at the Battle of the Nasan River after an attempted ambush. Captain Sandoval also won an engagement in Catubig. Spanish forces then surrounded the fort in Palapag in an attempt to force a surrender through starvation. However, the Lutao military official Don Francisco Macombo objected to this strategy, telling de Rojas that his forces were there to "fight the bandits of Palapag," not merely to clear land. During this siege, historical accounts note that when a Spanish commander offered a reward for Sumuroy's head, the rebels reportedly responded by sending a pig's head instead.

In response to Macombo's demands, de Rojas dispatched two divisions to assault the Palapag fort, while the third division guarded the main camp. The revolt effectively ended on July 2, 1650, when government forces successfully stormed the rebel fortifications. During the ensuing battle, Sumuroy's mother was killed, and the remaining rebels surrendered. The rebels subsequently killed Sumuroy and presented his severed head to the governor-general.

== Legacy ==
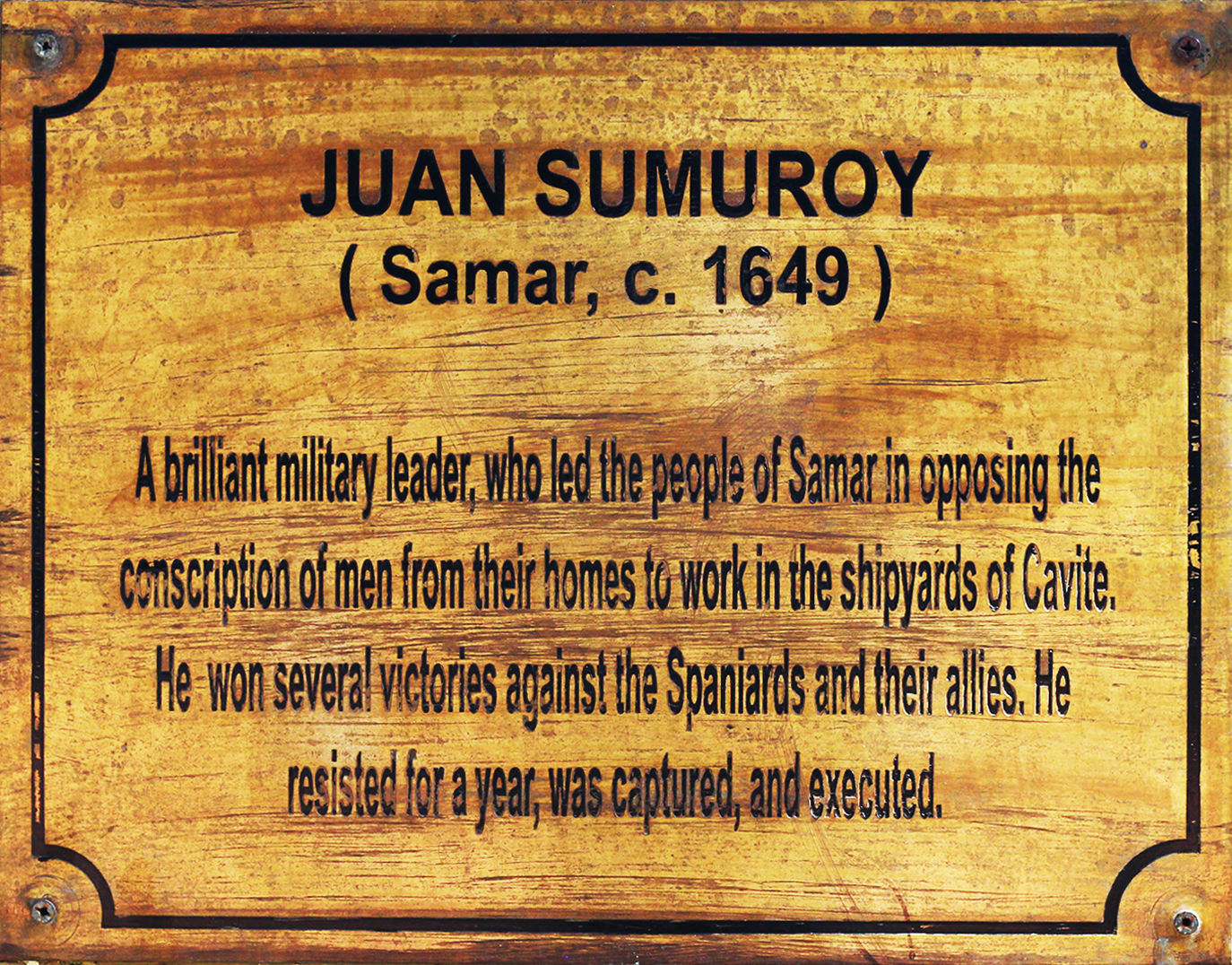
The citation of the statue

Sumuroy is commemorated in the scientific name of species of gecko, Cyrtodactylus sumuroi, which is endemic to Samar.

In 2008, the National Historical Commission installed a historical marker in the town of Palapag, Northern Samar for Agustín Sumuroy.

Palapag observes Sumuroy Day annually on 1 June to commemorate Agustín Sumuroy's heroism during the 1649 uprising against Spanish rule.
