= Draco supriatnai =

Scientific classification
- Kingdom: Animalia
- Phylum: Chordata
- Class: Reptilia
- Order: Squamata
- Suborder: Iguania
- Family: Agamidae
- Genus: Draco
- Species: D. supriatnai

Binomial name
- Draco supriatnai McGuire, Brown, Mumpuni, Riyanto, & Andayani, 2007
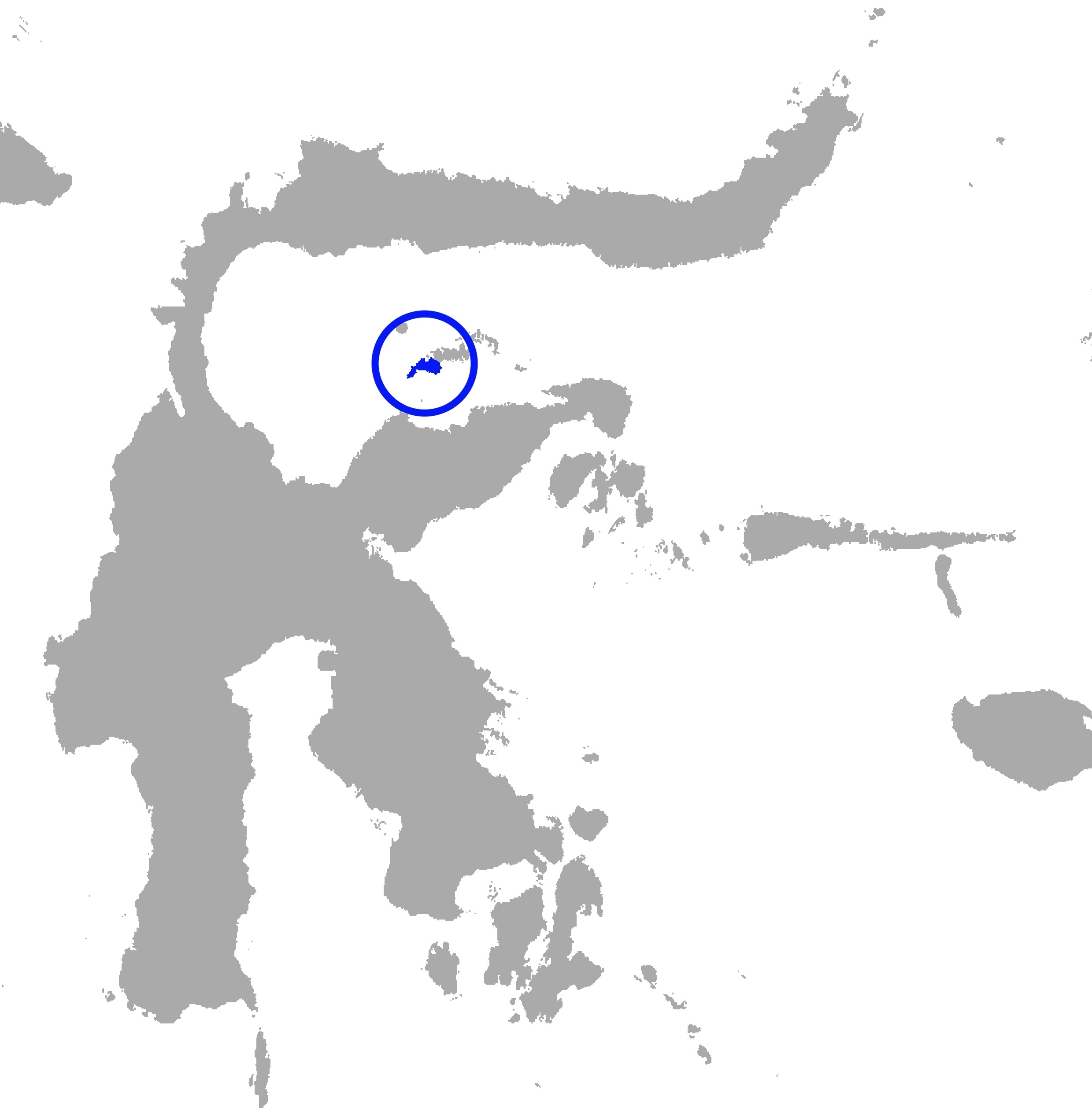

Species of lizard

Draco supriatnai is a species of agamid lizard. It is found in Indonesia.
