= Brachymeles hilong =

Graceful short-legged skink

Scientific classification
- Kingdom: Animalia
- Phylum: Chordata
- Class: Reptilia
- Order: Squamata
- Family: Scincidae
- Genus: Brachymeles
- Species: B. hilong

Binomial name
- Brachymeles hilong (Brown & Rabor, 1967)

Species of lizard

Brachymeles hilong, the graceful short-legged skink, is a species of skink endemic to the Philippines.
