= Brachymeles schadenbergi =

Schadenberg's burrowing skink

Conservation status
- Least Concern (IUCN 3.1)

Scientific classification
- Domain: Eukaryota
- Kingdom: Animalia
- Phylum: Chordata
- Class: Reptilia
- Order: Squamata
- Family: Scincidae
- Genus: Brachymeles
- Species: B. schadenbergi

Binomial name
- Brachymeles schadenbergi (Fischer, 1885)
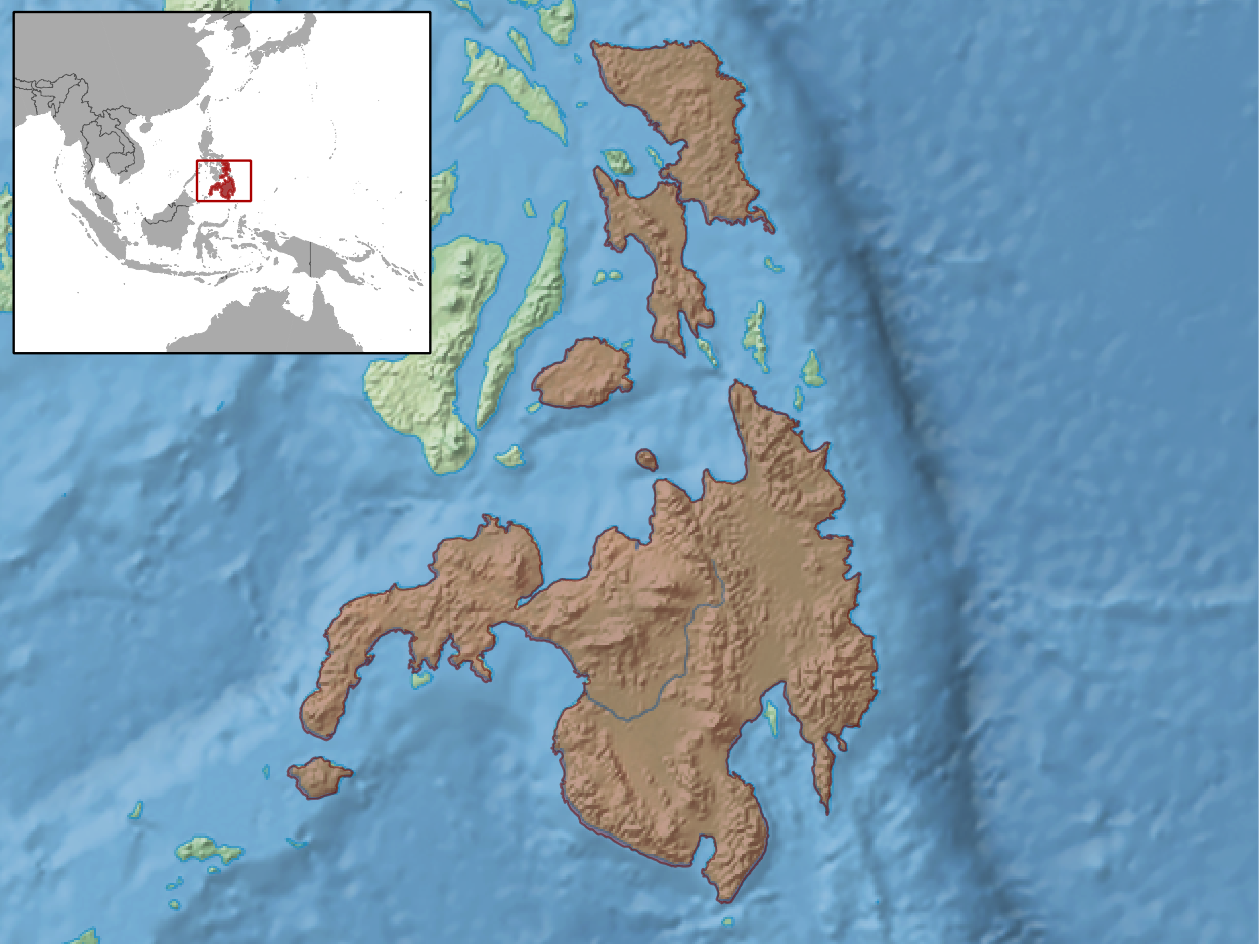

Species of lizard

Brachymeles schadenbergi, Schadenberg's burrowing skink, is a species of skink endemic to the Philippines.
