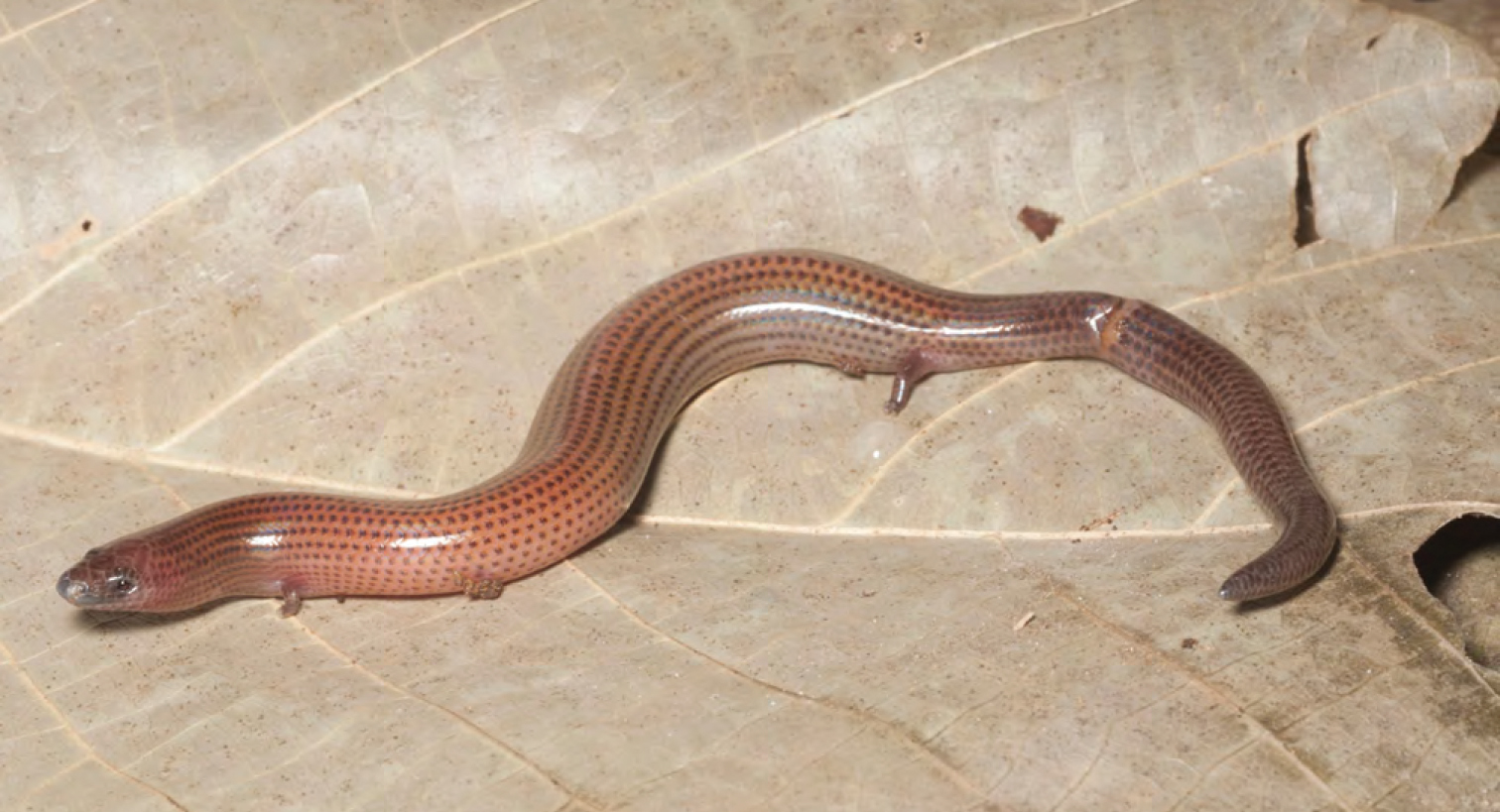
- Brachymeles muntingkamay

Scientific classification
- Kingdom: Animalia
- Phylum: Chordata
- Class: Reptilia
- Order: Squamata
- Family: Scincidae
- Subfamily: Scincinae
- Genus: Brachymeles; A.M.C. Duméril & Bibron, 1839

Species
- See text

= Brachymeles =

Genus of lizards

Brachymeles is a genus of skinks (lizards in the family Scincidae). The majority of the species within the genus are endemic to certain island ecosystems in the Philippines. In 2018, the Zoological Society of London through its EDGE of Existence Program listed the Cebu small worm skink (Brachymeles cebuensis) as the 80th most evolutionarily distinct and globally endangered reptile species in the world, making it the most endangered member of the genus Brachymeles.

== Taxonomy ==
Brachymeles is usually placed in the subfamily Scincinae, which seems to be paraphyletic however. Apparently part of a clade which does not seem to include the type genus Scincus, it will probably be eventually assigned to a new, yet-to-be-named subfamily (Austin & Arnold 2006).

== Species ==
The following species are accepted at The Reptile Database:

- Brachymeles apus Hikida, 1982 – Hikida's short-legged skink
- Brachymeles bicolandia Siler et al., 2011 – Bicol slender skink
- Brachymeles bicolor (Gray, 1845) – two-colored short-legged skink
- Brachymeles boholensis W.C. Brown & Rabor, 1967 – Bohol short-legged skink
- Brachymeles bonitae A.M.C. Duméril & Bibron, 1839 – stub-limbed burrowing skink, pretty short-legged skink
- Brachymeles boulengeri Taylor, 1922 – Boulenger's short-legged skink
- Brachymeles brevidactylus Siler et al., 2011 – Southern Bicol slender skink
- Brachymeles burksi Taylor, 1917 – Burks's burrowing skink
- Brachymeles cebuensis W.C. Brown & Rabor, 1967 – listed as an EDGE species by the Zoological Society of London – Rabor's short-legged skink
- Brachymeles cobos Siler et al., 2011 – Catanduañes slender skink
- Brachymeles dalawangdaliri Davis et al., 2016 – Tablas slender skink
- Brachymeles elerae Taylor, 1917 – common short-legged skink
- Brachymeles gracilis (Fischer, 1885) – graceful short-legged skink
- Brachymeles hilong W.C. Brown & Rabor, 1967 – graceful short-legged skink
- Brachymeles ilocandia Siler et al., 2016 – Ilokano slender skink
- Brachymeles isangdaliri Davis et al., 2014 – Aurora slender skink
- Brachymeles kadwa Siler & R.M. Brown, 2010 – Jessi's slender skink
- Brachymeles libayani Siler et al., 2011 – Lapinig Islands slender skink
- Brachymeles ligtas Geheber et al., 2016 – Lubang slender skink
- Brachymeles lukbani Siler et al., 2010
- Brachymeles makusog Siler et al., 2010
- Brachymeles mapalanggaon Davis et al., 2014 – Masbate slender skink
- Brachymeles mindorensis W.C. Brown & Rabor, 1967 – Mindoro short-legged skink
- Brachymeles minimus W.C. Brown & E.L. Alcala, 1995
- Brachymeles miriamae (Heyer, 1972) – Miriam's skink
- Brachymeles muntingkamay Siler et al., 2009 – Caraballo Mountains loam-swimming skink
- Brachymeles orientalis W.C. Brown & Rabor, 1967 – southern burrowing skink
- Brachymeles paeforum Siler et al., 2011 – PAEF slender skink
- Brachymeles pathfinderi Taylor, 1925 – pathfinder short-legged skink
- Brachymeles samad Siler et al., 2012 – Eastern Visayas slender skink
- Brachymeles samarensis W.C. Brown, 1956 – Brown's short-legged skink
- Brachymeles schadenbergi (Fischer, 1885) – Schadenberg's burrowing skink
- Brachymeles suluensis Taylor, 1918 – graceful short-legged skink
- Brachymeles talinis W.C. Brown, 1956 – Duméril's short-legged skink
- Brachymeles taylori W.C. Brown, 1956 – Taylor's short-legged skink
- Brachymeles tiboliorum Siler et al., 2012 – Western Mindanao slender skink
- Brachymeles tridactylus W.C. Brown, 1956 – three-fingered short-legged skink
- Brachymeles tungaoi Siler & R.M. Brown, 2010 – Tungao's slender skink
- Brachymeles vermis Taylor, 1918 – Taylor's short-legged skink
- Brachymeles vindumi Siler & R.M. Brown, 2010 – Jens's slender skink
- Brachymeles vulcani Siler et al., 2012 – Camiguin Sur slender skink
- Brachymeles wrighti Taylor, 1925 – Wright's short-legged skink

Nota bene: A binomial authority in parentheses indicates that the species was originally described in a genus other than Brachymeles.
