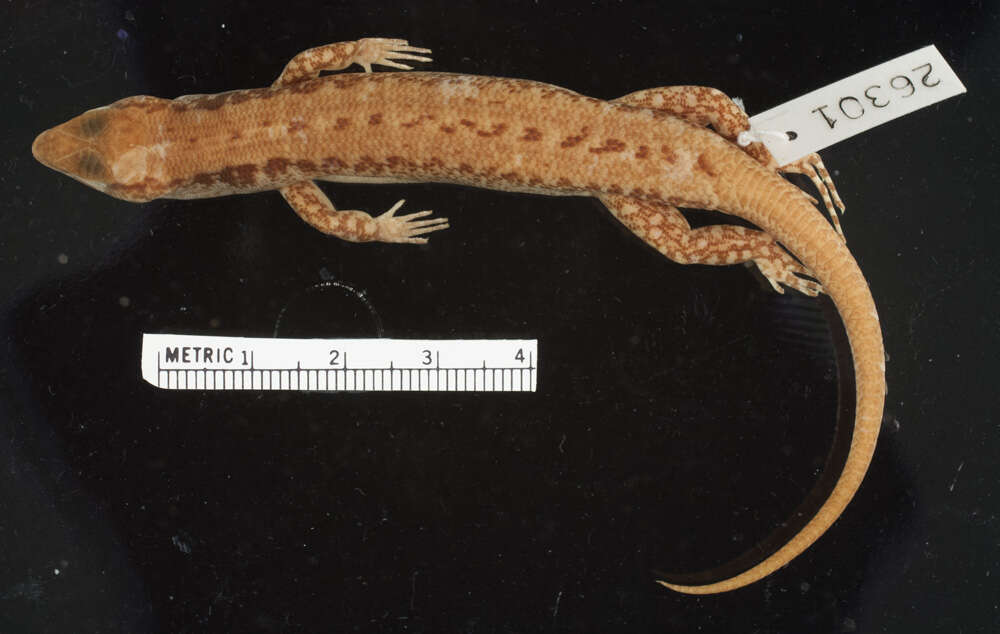

Conservation status
- Data Deficient (IUCN 3.1)

Scientific classification
- Kingdom: Animalia
- Phylum: Chordata
- Class: Reptilia
- Order: Squamata
- Family: Scincidae
- Genus: Insulasaurus
- Species: I. wrighti

Binomial name
- Insulasaurus wrighti Taylor, 1925

Synonyms
- Insulasaurus wrighti Taylor, 1925; Sphenomorphus wrighti — Greer & F. Parker, 1967; Lygosoma (Sphenomorphus) wrighti — W.C. Brown & Alcala, 1970; Sphenomorphus wrighti — W.C. Brown & Alcala, 1980; Insulasaurus wrighti — Linkem, Diesmos & R.M. Brown, 2011

= Insulasaurus wrighti =

Species of lizard

Insulasaurus wrighti, also known commonly as Wright's sphenomorphus, is a species of skink, a lizard in the family Scincidae. The species is endemic to Palawan in the Philippines.

== Etymology ==
The specific name, wrighti, is in honor of American philanthropist John Dutton Wright (1866–1952), who financed Taylor's collecting trip to Palawan.

== Habitat ==
The preferred natural habitat of I. wrighti is unknown; specimens have been collected at an altitude of 300 m (980 ft).

== Description ==
I. wrighti is a medium-sized skink measuring 45–64 mm (1.8–2.5 in) in snout-to-vent length.

== Reproduction ==
The mode of reproduction of I. wrighti is unknown.
