= Brachymeles tridactylus =

Three-fingered short-legged skink

Conservation status
- Least Concern (IUCN 3.1)

Scientific classification
- Kingdom: Animalia
- Phylum: Chordata
- Class: Reptilia
- Order: Squamata
- Suborder: Scinciformata
- Infraorder: Scincomorpha
- Family: Scincidae
- Genus: Brachymeles
- Species: B. tridactylus

Binomial name
- Brachymeles tridactylus Brown, 1956
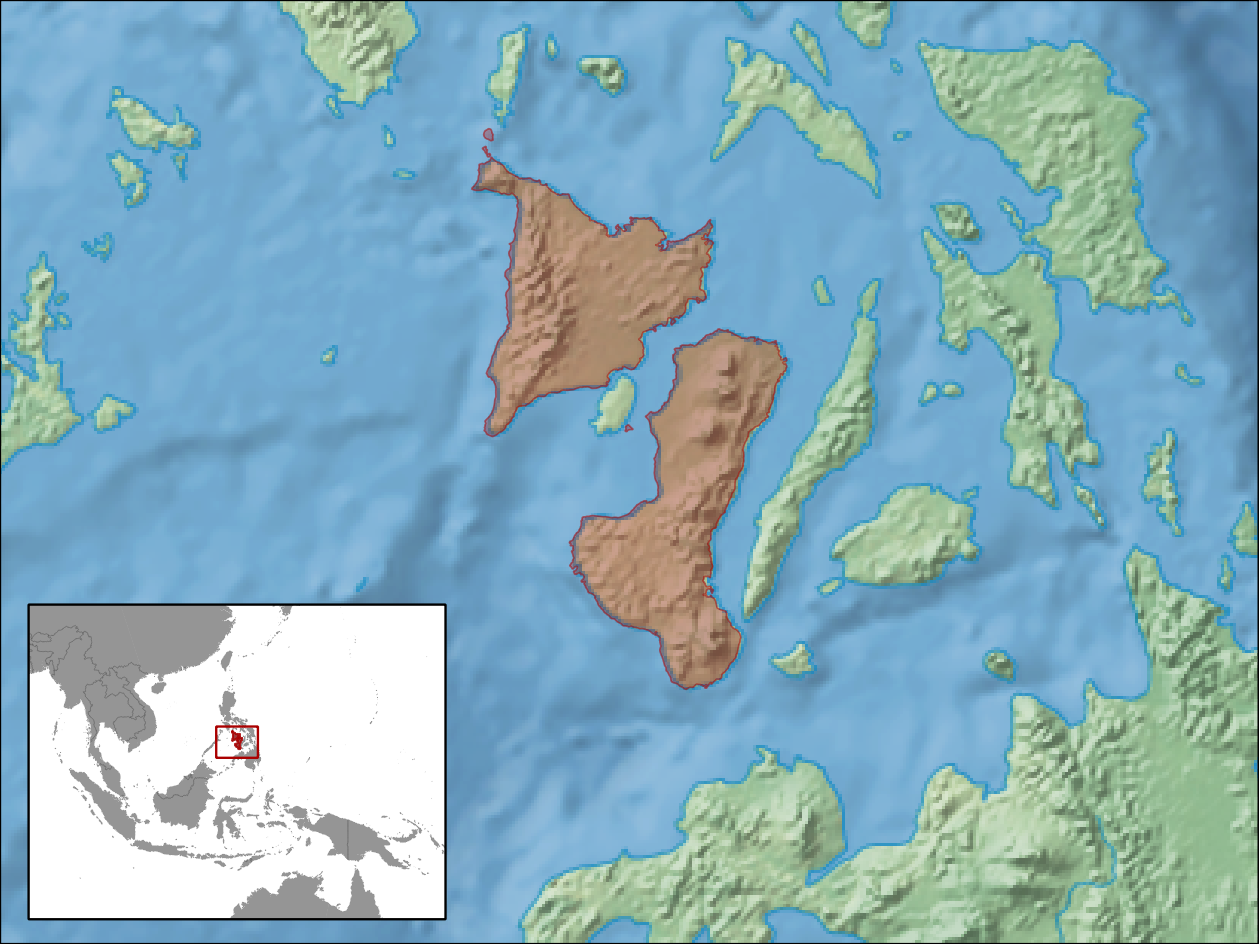

Species of lizard

Brachymeles tridactylus, the three-fingered short-legged skink, is a species of skink endemic to the Philippines.
