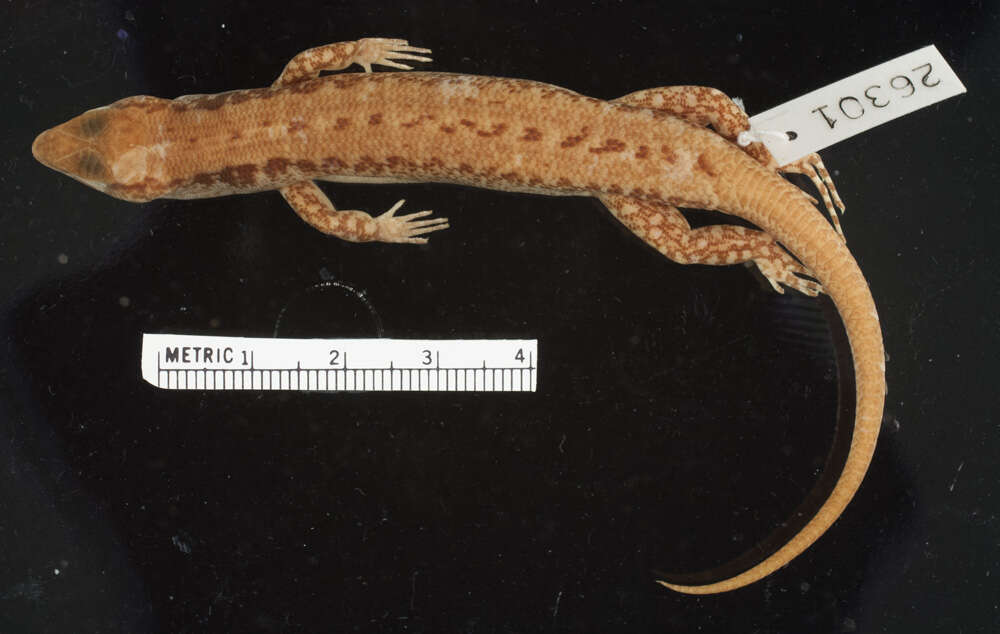
- Insulasaurus wrighti

Scientific classification
- Kingdom: Animalia
- Phylum: Chordata
- Class: Reptilia
- Order: Squamata
- Family: Scincidae
- Subfamily: Sphenomorphinae
- Genus: Insulasaurus; Taylor, 1925

Type species
- Insulasaurus wrighti Taylor, 1925

Species
- 4 species (see text)

= Insulasaurus =

Genus of lizards

Insulasaurus is a genus of skinks. They are all endemic to the Philippines.

== Species ==
The following four species, listed alphabetically by specific name, are recognized as being valid:

- Insulasaurus arborens (Taylor, 1917)
- Insulasaurus traanorum (Linkem, Diesmos & Brown, 2010)
- Insulasaurus victoria (Brown & Alcala, 1980)
- Insulasaurus wrighti Taylor, 1925

Nota bene: A binomial authority in parentheses indicates that the species was originally described in a genus other than Insulasaurus.
