= Brachymeles isangdaliri =

Aurora slender skink

Conservation status
- Data Deficient (IUCN 3.1)

Scientific classification
- Kingdom: Animalia
- Phylum: Chordata
- Class: Reptilia
- Order: Squamata
- Family: Scincidae
- Genus: Brachymeles
- Species: B. isangdaliri

Binomial name
- Brachymeles isangdaliri Davis, Feller, Brown, & Siler, 2014

Species of lizard

Brachymeles isangdaliri, the Aurora slender skink, is a species of skink endemic to the Philippines.
