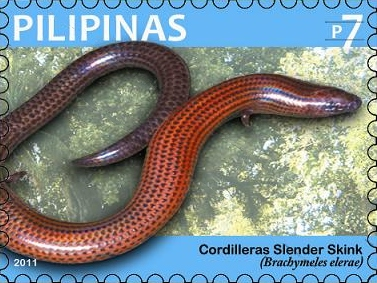

Conservation status
- Least Concern (IUCN 3.1)

Scientific classification
- Kingdom: Animalia
- Phylum: Chordata
- Class: Reptilia
- Order: Squamata
- Family: Scincidae
- Genus: Brachymeles
- Species: B. elerae

Binomial name
- Brachymeles elerae Taylor, 1917
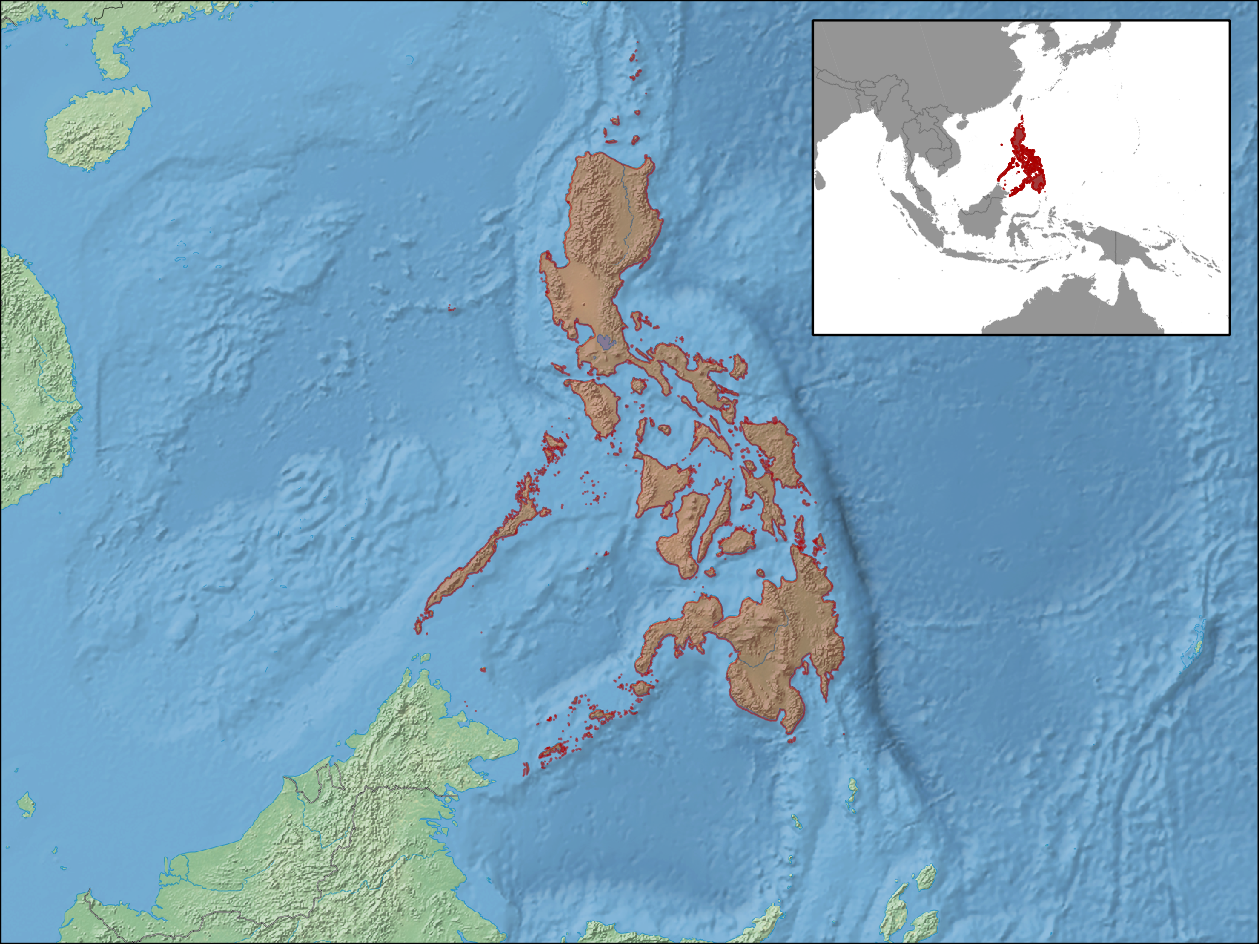

= Brachymeles elerae =

Species of lizard

Brachymeles elerae, also known commonly as the common short-legged skink and the Cordilleras slender skink, is a species of lizard in the family Scincidae. The species is endemic to the Philippines. It is found throughout most of the country, albeit very rarely, hence the species is poorly characterized.
