= Brachymeles minimus =

Conservation status
- Near Threatened (IUCN 3.1)

Scientific classification
- Kingdom: Animalia
- Phylum: Chordata
- Class: Reptilia
- Order: Squamata
- Family: Scincidae
- Genus: Brachymeles
- Species: B. minimus

Binomial name
- Brachymeles minimus Brown & Alcala, 1995
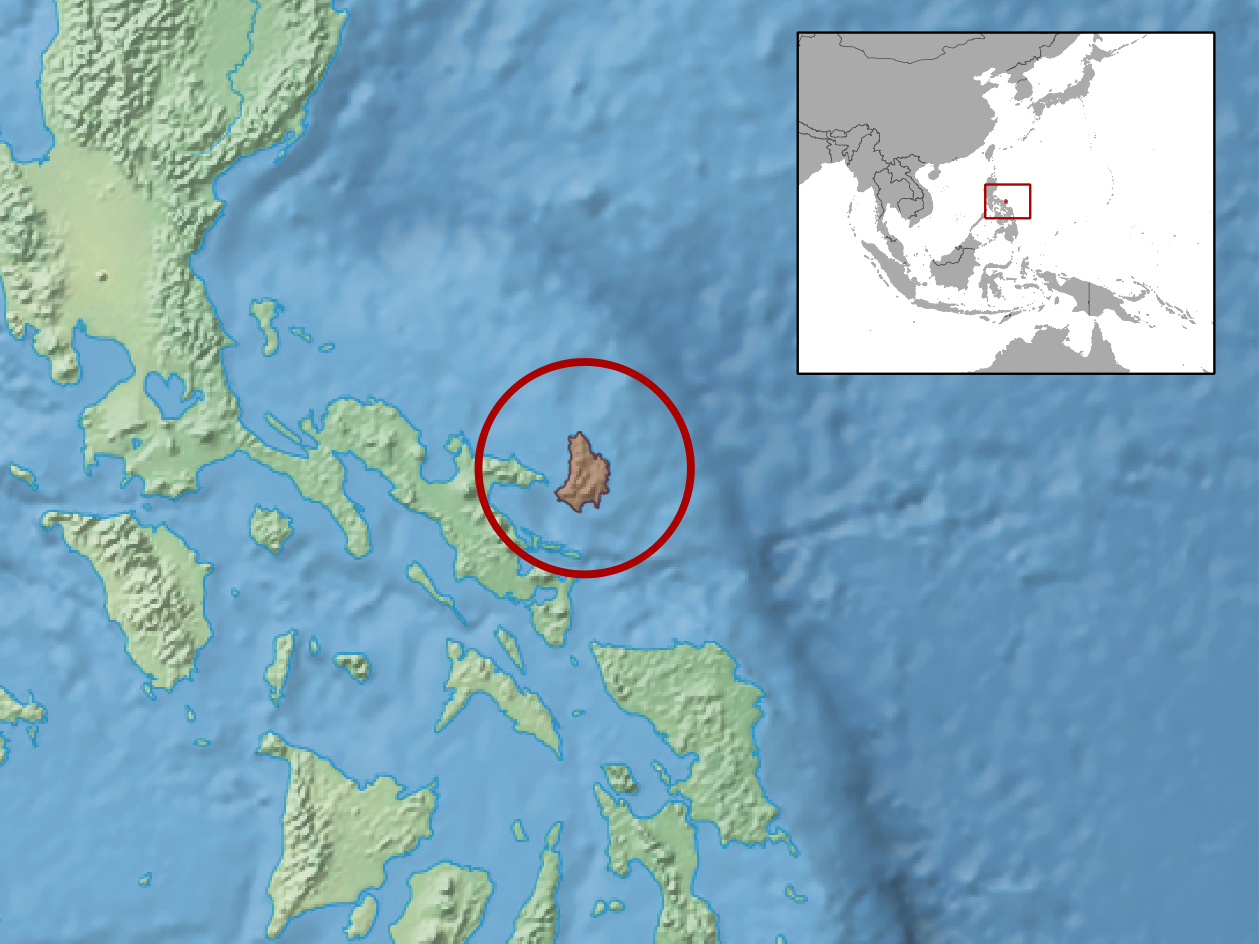

Species of lizard

Brachymeles minimus is a species of skink endemic to the Philippines.
