= Brachymeles dalawangdaliri =

Tablas slender skink

Conservation status
- Least Concern (IUCN 3.1)

Scientific classification
- Kingdom: Animalia
- Phylum: Chordata
- Class: Reptilia
- Order: Squamata
- Family: Scincidae
- Genus: Brachymeles
- Species: B. dalawangdaliri

Binomial name
- Brachymeles dalawangdaliri Davis, Geheber, Watters, Penrod, Feller, Ashford, Kouri, Nguyen, Shauberger, Sheatsley, Winfrey, Wong, Sanguila, Brown, & Siler, 2016

Species of lizard

Brachymeles dalawangdaliri, the Tablas slender skink, is a species of skink endemic to the Philippines.
