= Insulasaurus arborens =

Conservation status
- Least Concern (IUCN 3.1)

Scientific classification
- Kingdom: Animalia
- Phylum: Chordata
- Class: Reptilia
- Order: Squamata
- Family: Scincidae
- Genus: Insulasaurus
- Species: I. arborens

Binomial name
- Insulasaurus arborens (Taylor, 1917)
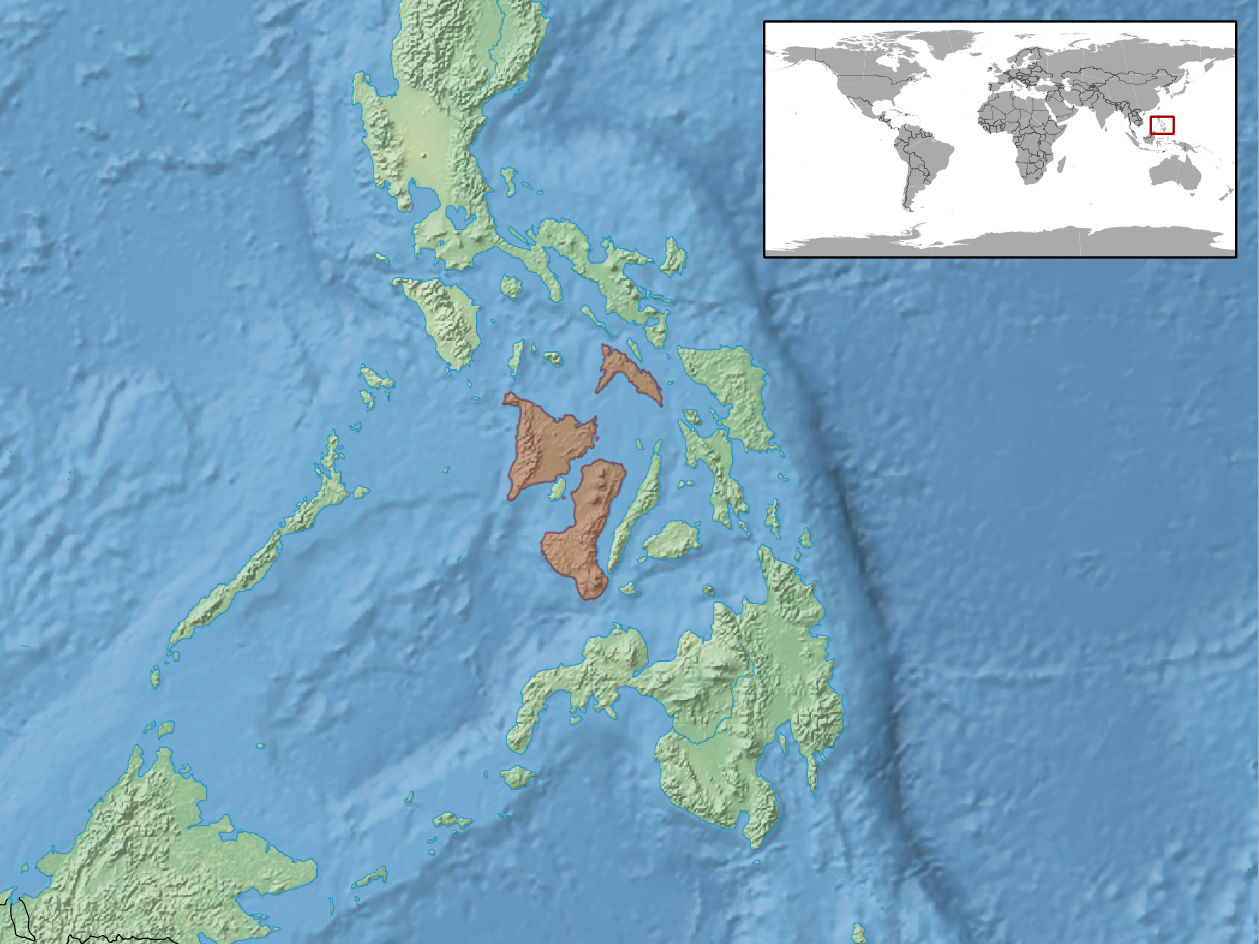

Synonyms
- Sphenomorphus arborens Taylor, 1917

Species of lizard

Insulasaurus arborens, also known as the Negros sphenomorphus, is a species of lizard of the family of Scincidae. It is endemic to the Philippines.

== Distribution ==
It is found on the islands of Negros, Panay, Pan de Azúcar and Masbate at elevations below 1,600 m (5,200 ft).

== Original publication ==
- Taylor, 1917 : Snakes and lizards known from Negros, with descriptions of new species and subspecies. Philippine Journal of Science, vol. 12, p. 353-381 (texte intégral).
