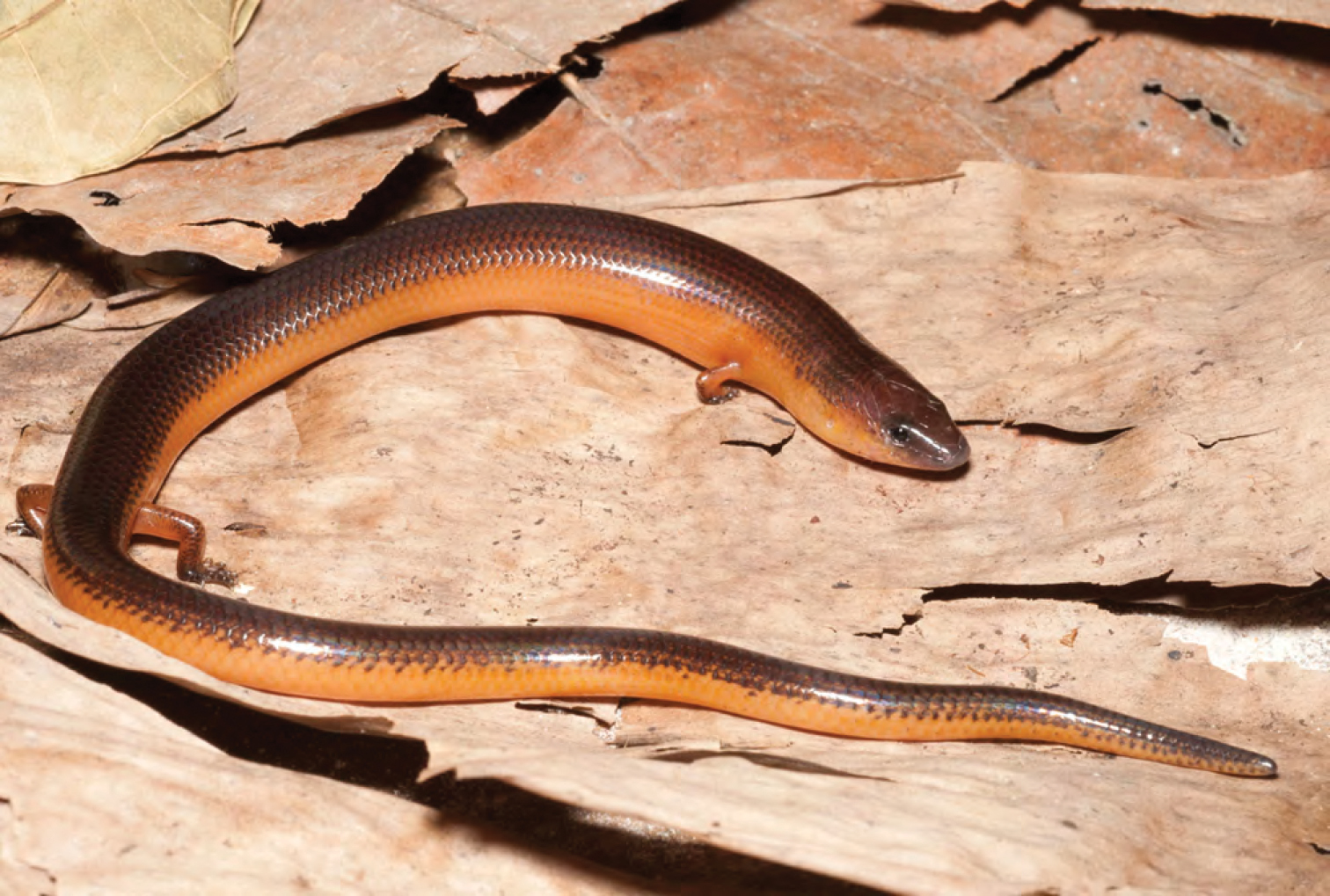

Conservation status
- Least Concern (IUCN 3.1)

Scientific classification
- Kingdom: Animalia
- Phylum: Chordata
- Class: Reptilia
- Order: Squamata
- Family: Scincidae
- Genus: Brachymeles
- Species: B. bicolor

Binomial name
- Brachymeles bicolor (Gray, 1845)
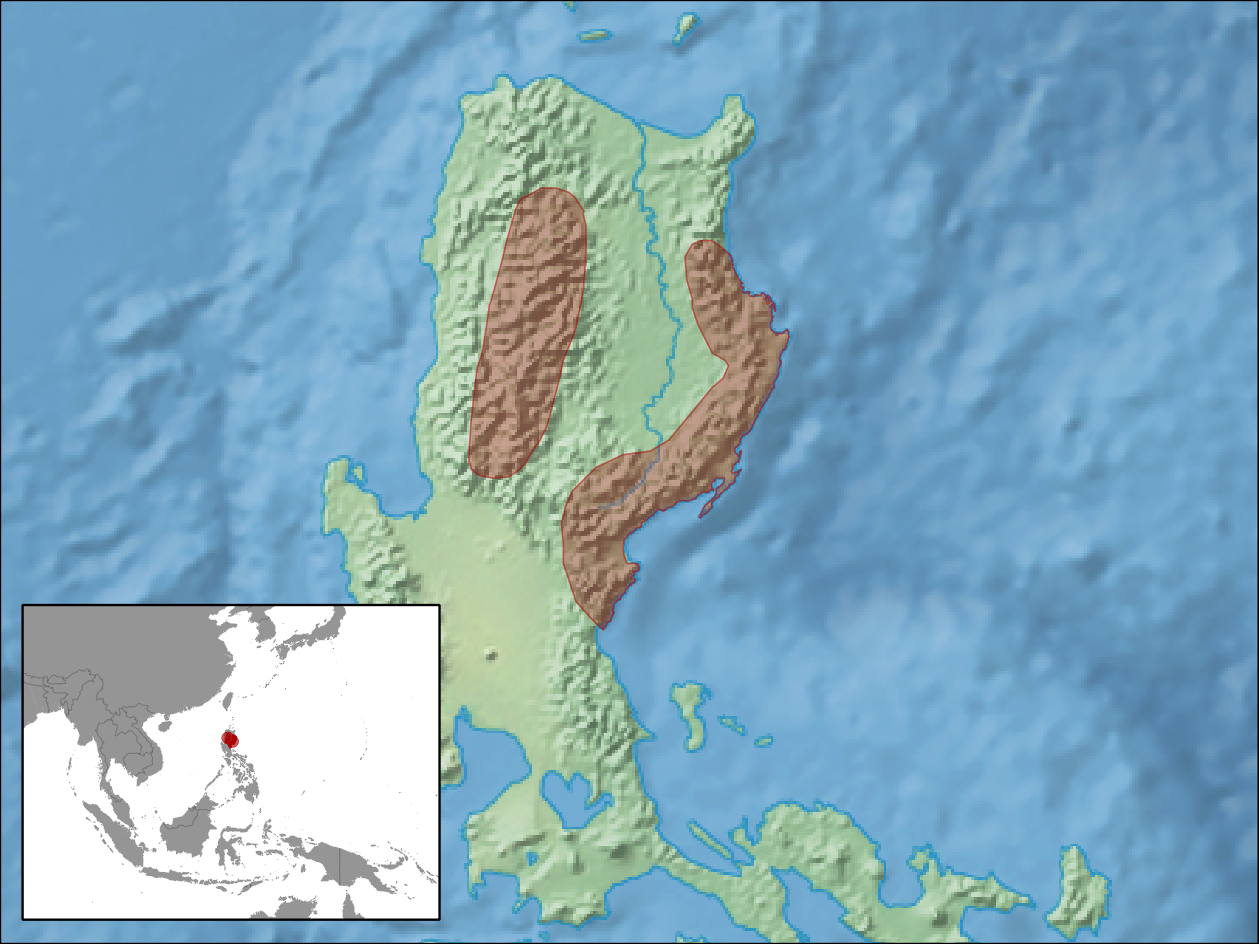

Synonyms
- Senira bicolor Gray, 1845

= Brachymeles bicolor =

Two-colored short-legged skink

Species of lizard

Brachymeles bicolor, common name two-colored short-legged skink, is a species of skink endemic to Luzon, the Philippines. It is widely distributed through the island, at elevations of 250 to 850 m above sea level. However, its population is declining due to deforestation, and hence the species is classified as least concern by the IUCN.
