= Brachymeles ligtas =

Lubang slender skink

Conservation status
- Least Concern (IUCN 3.1)

Scientific classification
- Kingdom: Animalia
- Phylum: Chordata
- Class: Reptilia
- Order: Squamata
- Family: Scincidae
- Genus: Brachymeles
- Species: B. ligtas

Binomial name
- Brachymeles ligtas Geheber, Davis, Watters, Penrod, Feller, Davey, Ellsworth, Flanagan, Heitz, Moore, Nguyen, Roberts, Sutton, Sanguila, Linkem, Brown, & Siler, 2016

Species of lizard

The Lubang slender skink (Brachymeles ligtas) is a species of skink in the Scincidae family endemic to the Lubang Islands, Philippines .
