= Brachymeles mapalanggaon =

Masbate slender skink

Conservation status
- Vulnerable (IUCN 3.1)

Scientific classification
- Kingdom: Animalia
- Phylum: Chordata
- Class: Reptilia
- Order: Squamata
- Family: Scincidae
- Genus: Brachymeles
- Species: B. mapalanggaon

Binomial name
- Brachymeles mapalanggaon Davis, Feller, Brown, & Siler, 2014

Species of lizard

Brachymeles mapalanggaon, the Masbate slender skink, is a species of skink endemic to the Philippines.
