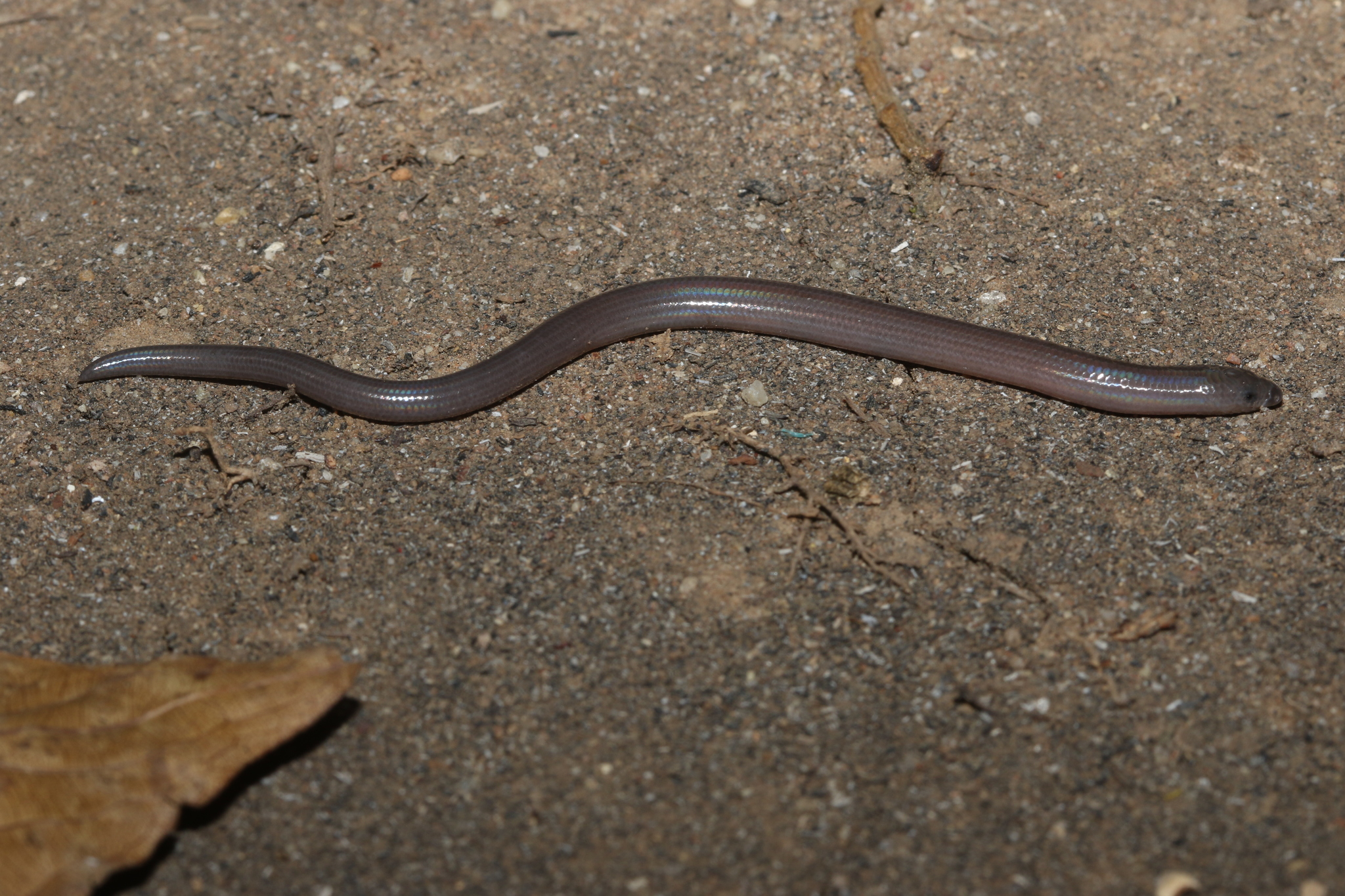
- Brachymeles miriamae in Udom Sap, Wang Nam Khiao, Thailand

Conservation status
- Least Concern (IUCN 3.1)

Scientific classification
- Kingdom: Animalia
- Phylum: Chordata
- Class: Reptilia
- Order: Squamata
- Family: Scincidae
- Genus: Brachymeles
- Species: B. miriamae

Binomial name
- Brachymeles miriamae (Heyer, 1972)

Synonyms
- Davewakeum miriamae Heyer, 1972; Brachymeles miriamae — Siler et al., 2011; Davewakeum miriamae — Chan-ard et al., 2015; Brachymeles miriamae — Cota et al., 2022

= Miriam's skink =

Species of lizard

Miriam's skink (Brachymeles miriamae) is a species of lizard in the subfamily Scincinae of the family Scincidae (skinks). The species is endemic to Thailand.

== Taxonomy ==
In 1972 Heyer described Miriam's skink as a new species in a new genus, giving it the scientific name Davewakeum miriamae. In 2011 Siler et al. included the genus Davewakeum in the genus Brachymeles, creating the new combination, Brachymeles miriamae (Heyer, 1972). In 2015 Chan-ard et al. returned the species to the genus Davewakeum. In 2022 Cota et al. reassigned the species to the genus Brachymeles.

== Etymology ==
The specific name, miriamae, is in honor of Miriam Heyer, who collected the holotype, and is married to American herpetologist W. Ronald Heyer.

The generic name, Davewakeum, is in honor of American herpetologist David B. Wake.

== Geographic range ==
Miriam's skink is found in Nakhon Ratchasima Province, Thailand.

== Habitat ==
The preferred natural habitat of Brachymeles miriamae is forest.

== Behavior ==
Brachymeles miriamae is terrestrial and fossorial.

== Description ==
Miriam's skink is limbless.

== Reproduction ==
Brachymeles miriamae is viviparous.
