= Insulasaurus traanorum =

Scientific classification
- Kingdom: Animalia
- Phylum: Chordata
- Class: Reptilia
- Order: Squamata
- Family: Scincidae
- Genus: Insulasaurus
- Species: I. traanorum

Binomial name
- Insulasaurus traanorum (Linkem, Diesmos & Brown, 2010)

Synonyms
- Sphenomorphus traanorum Linkem, Diesmos & Brown, 2010

Species of lizard

Insulasaurus traanorum is a species of skink. It is endemic to Palawan in the Philippines. It is a medium-sized skink with mature individuals measuring 48–53 mm (1.9–2.1 in) in snout–vent length.
