= Brachymeles wrighti =

Wright's short-legged skink

Conservation status
- Data Deficient (IUCN 3.1)

Scientific classification
- Domain: Eukaryota
- Kingdom: Animalia
- Phylum: Chordata
- Class: Reptilia
- Order: Squamata
- Family: Scincidae
- Genus: Brachymeles
- Species: B. wrighti

Binomial name
- Brachymeles wrighti Taylor, 1925
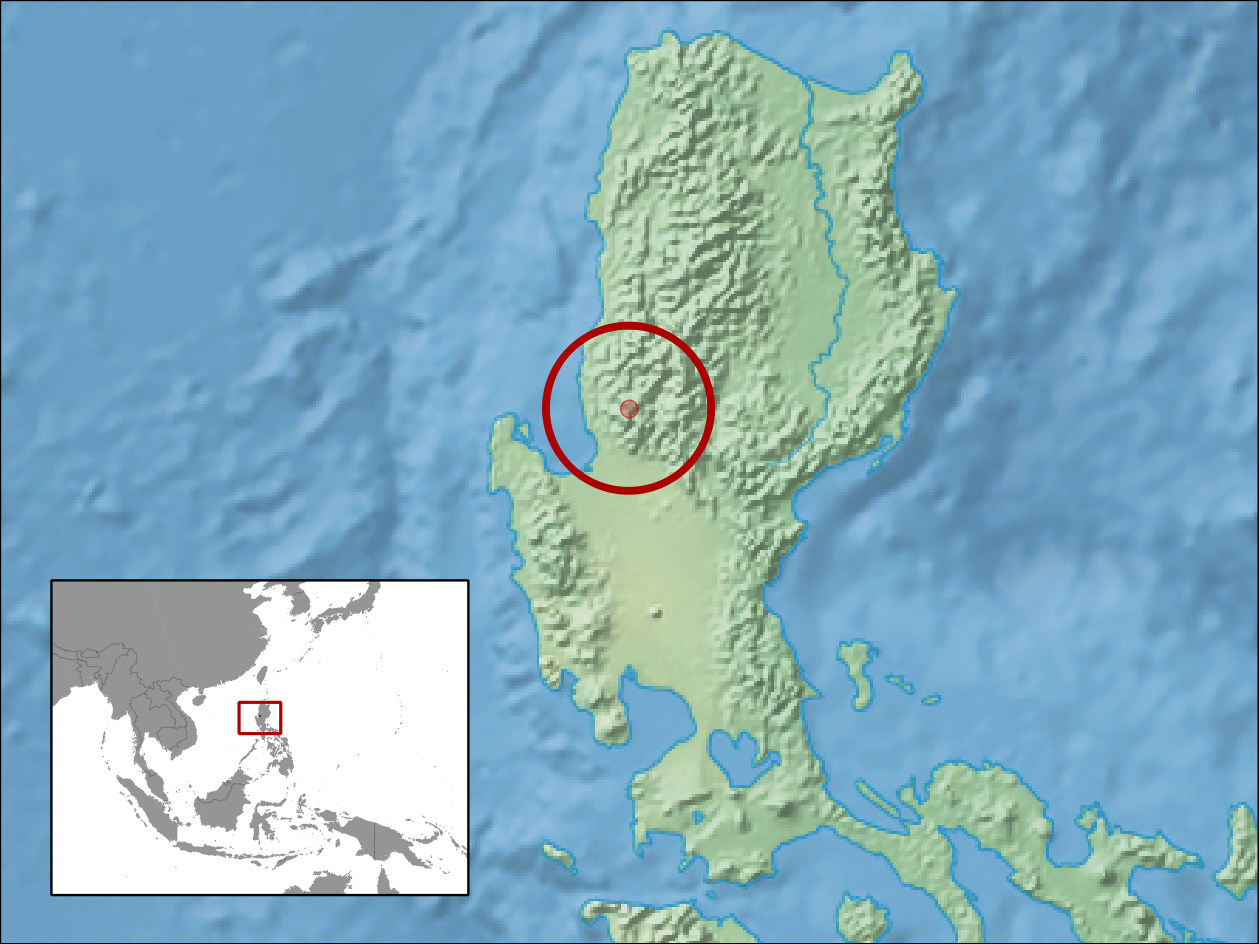

Species of lizard

Brachymeles wrighti, Wright's short-legged skink, is a species of skink endemic to the Philippines.
