= Brachymeles apus =

Hikida's short-legged skink

Conservation status
- Least Concern (IUCN 3.1)

Scientific classification
- Kingdom: Animalia
- Phylum: Chordata
- Class: Reptilia
- Order: Squamata
- Family: Scincidae
- Genus: Brachymeles
- Species: B. apus

Binomial name
- Brachymeles apus Hikida, 1982

Species of lizard

Brachymeles apus, Hikida's short-legged skink, is a species of skink endemic to Malaysia.
