= Brachymeles lukbani =

Conservation status
- Least Concern (IUCN 3.1)

Scientific classification
- Kingdom: Animalia
- Phylum: Chordata
- Class: Reptilia
- Order: Squamata
- Family: Scincidae
- Genus: Brachymeles
- Species: B. lukbani

Binomial name
- Brachymeles lukbani Siler, Balete, Diesmos & R.M. Brown, 2010

Species of lizard

Brachymeles lukbani, also known commonly as Lukban's loam-swimming skink, is a species of lizard in the subfamily Scincinae of the family Scincidae. The species is endemic to the island of Luzon in the Philippines.

== Etymology ==
The specific name, lukbani, is in honor of Vicente Lukbán, who was a Filipino general and governor.

== Description ==
Brachymeles lukbani is slender, and has no external legs. It has 21–23 scale rows around the body at midbody, and 100–106 scales in the paravertebral row. It has six upper labials and three pairs of chin shields, the first pair in contact with each other, the third pair enlarged.

== Limb reduction ==
The skink species Brachymeles lukbani has a unique pattern of limb reduction; as an adult, it seems to be limbless on the outside but has a concealed limb rudiment, which is called cryptomelia. This phenomenon sheds light on the evolutionary processes responsible for the recurring reduction and loss of limbs in this species, suggesting the existence of temporary growing limbs during embryonic stages.

== Habitat ==
The preferred natural habitat of Brachymeles lukbani is forest, at altitudes of 200–1,115 m (656–3,658 ft), but it has also been found in plantations.

== Behavior ==
Brachymeles lukbani is terrestrial and semifossorial.

== Reproduction ==
The mode of reproduction of Brachymeles lukbani has been described as being ovoviviparous and as being viviparous.
