= Brachymeles samarensis =

Brown's short-legged skink

Conservation status
- Near Threatened (IUCN 3.1)

Scientific classification
- Kingdom: Animalia
- Phylum: Chordata
- Class: Reptilia
- Order: Squamata
- Family: Scincidae
- Genus: Brachymeles
- Species: B. samarensis

Binomial name
- Brachymeles samarensis Brown, 1956
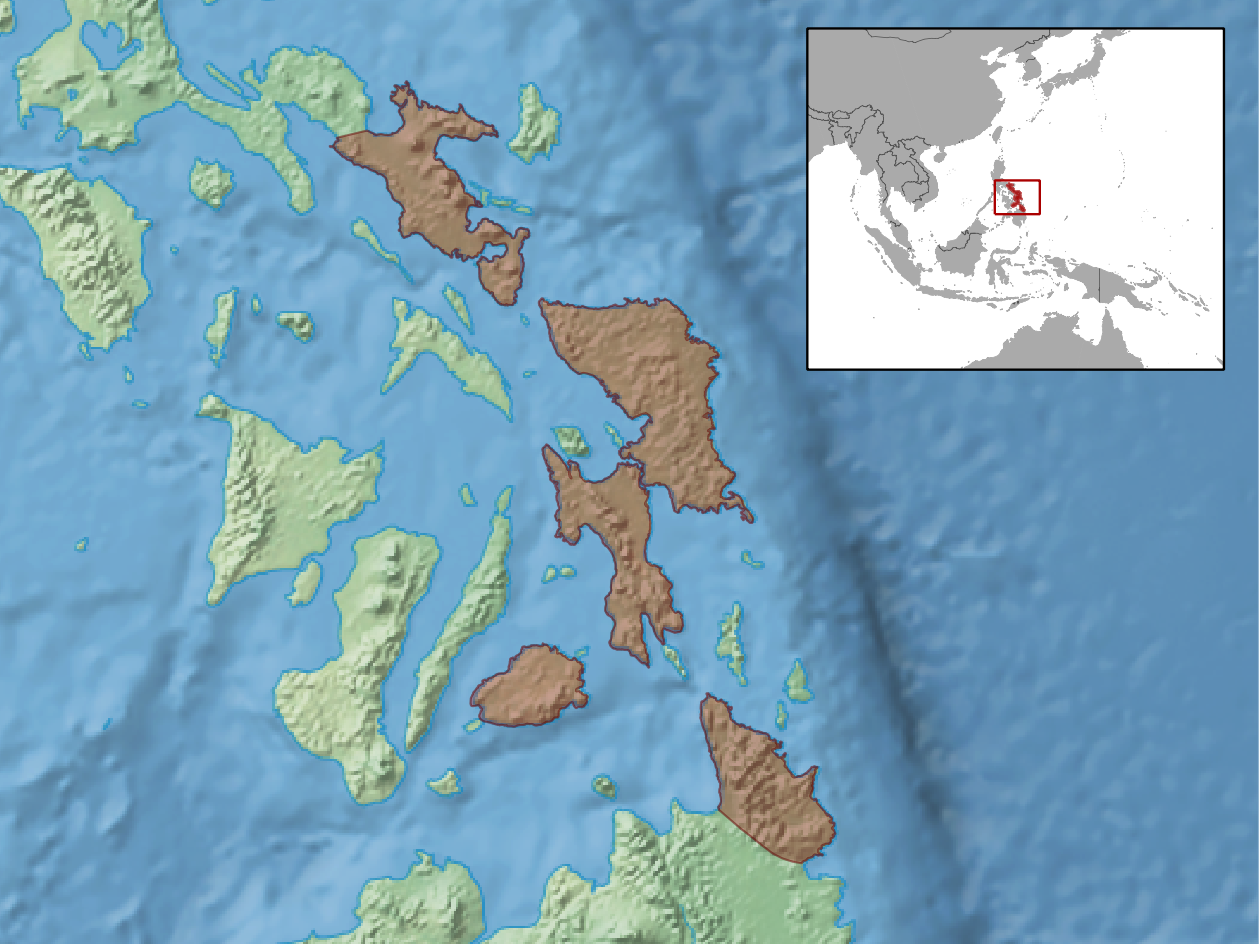

Species of lizard

Brachymeles samarensis, Brown's short-legged skink, is a species of skink endemic to the Philippines.
