= Brachymeles tiboliorum =

Western Mindanao slender skink

Conservation status
- Data Deficient (IUCN 3.1)

Scientific classification
- Kingdom: Animalia
- Phylum: Chordata
- Class: Reptilia
- Order: Squamata
- Family: Scincidae
- Genus: Brachymeles
- Species: B. tiboliorum

Binomial name
- Brachymeles tiboliorum Siler, Jones, Diesmos, Diesmos, & Brown, 2012

Species of lizard

Brachymeles tiboliorum, the Western Mindanao slender skink, is a species of skink endemic to the Philippines.
