= Brachymeles taylori =

Taylor's short-legged skink

Scientific classification
- Domain: Eukaryota
- Kingdom: Animalia
- Phylum: Chordata
- Class: Reptilia
- Order: Squamata
- Family: Scincidae
- Genus: Brachymeles
- Species: B. taylori

Binomial name
- Brachymeles taylori Brown, 1956

Species of lizard

Brachymeles taylori, Taylor's short-legged skink, is a species of skink endemic to the Philippines.
