= Cyrtodactylus sumuroi =

Scientific classification
- Kingdom: Animalia
- Phylum: Chordata
- Class: Reptilia
- Order: Squamata
- Suborder: Gekkota
- Family: Gekkonidae
- Genus: Cyrtodactylus
- Species: C. sumuroi

Binomial name
- Cyrtodactylus sumuroi Welton, Siler, Linkem, Diesmos & R. Brown, 2010

Species of lizard

Cyrtodactylus sumuroi is a species of gecko, a lizard in the family Gekkonidae. The species is endemic to Samar in the Philippines.

== Etymology ==
The specific name, sumuroi, is in honor of Filipino hero Agustín Sumuroy, also known as Juan Sumuroy, who led a rebellion against Spanish colonialism in 1649.

== Description ==
Adults of C. sumuroi have a snout-to-vent length (SVL) of about 8 cm (3.1 in).

== Reproduction ==
The mode of reproduction of C. sumoroi is unknown.
