= Brachymeles paeforum =

Conservation status
- Least Concern (IUCN 3.1)

Scientific classification
- Kingdom: Animalia
- Phylum: Chordata
- Class: Reptilia
- Order: Squamata
- Family: Scincidae
- Genus: Brachymeles
- Species: B. paeforum

Binomial name
- Brachymeles paeforum Siler, Fuiten, Jones, Alcala, & Brown, 2011

Species of lizard

Brachymeles paeforum, the PAEF slender skink, is a species of skink endemic to the Philippines. Brachymeles paeforum can be distinguished from its congeners by a unique combination of morphological characteristics. It is a small-bodied species with a snout–vent length (SVL) ranging from 47.2 to 66.1 mm. The limbs are tridactyl and relatively short. It possesses six supralabials, five or six infralabials, six supraciliaries, and five supraoculars. The species has 21 to 22 midbody scale rows, 71 to 74 axilla–groin scale rows, and 93 to 96 paravertebral scale rows. A pineal eye spot is present, and the prefrontals do not contact each other at the midline, whereas the frontoparietals do. There are three pairs of enlarged chin shields, and the nuchals are also enlarged. The fourth supralabial lies below the midline of the eye. Notably, the species lacks an auricular opening and has 47 presacral vertebrae. The body coloration is uniform throughout. It is a semifossorial skink typically inhabiting the forest floor of lowland forests. It is commonly found in dry, rotting organic material located inside or beneath decaying logs, as well as in loose soil, forest detritus, and leaf litter. This microhabitat preference reflects the species’ adaptation to a concealed, ground-dwelling lifestyle, where it can remain protected from predators and environmental extremes.
