= Brachymeles samad =

Eastern Visayas slender skink

Conservation status
- Least Concern (IUCN 3.1)

Scientific classification
- Kingdom: Animalia
- Phylum: Chordata
- Class: Reptilia
- Order: Squamata
- Family: Scincidae
- Genus: Brachymeles
- Species: B. samad

Binomial name
- Brachymeles samad Siler, Jones, Diesmos, Diesmos, & Brown, 2012

Species of lizard

Brachymeles samad, the Eastern Visayas slender skink, is a species of skink endemic to the Philippines.
