= Limnonectes ferneri =

Scientific classification
- Kingdom: Animalia
- Phylum: Chordata
- Class: Amphibia
- Order: Anura
- Family: Dicroglossidae
- Genus: Limnonectes
- Species: L. ferneri

Binomial name
- Limnonectes ferneri Siler, McVay, Diesmos & Brown, 2009

Species of amphibian

Limnonectes ferneri is a species of fanged frogs in the family Dicroglossidae. It is endemic to Mindanao, Philippines, where it was recorded on Mount Pasian, Monkayo, Compostela Valley.
