= Cyrtodactylus spinosus =

Scientific classification
- Kingdom: Animalia
- Phylum: Chordata
- Class: Reptilia
- Order: Squamata
- Suborder: Gekkota
- Family: Gekkonidae
- Genus: Cyrtodactylus
- Species: C. spinosus

Binomial name
- Cyrtodactylus spinosus Linkem, McGuire, Hayden, Setiadi, Bickford, & Brown, 2008

Species of lizard

Cyrtodactylus spinosus is a species of gecko that is endemic to Sulawesi.
