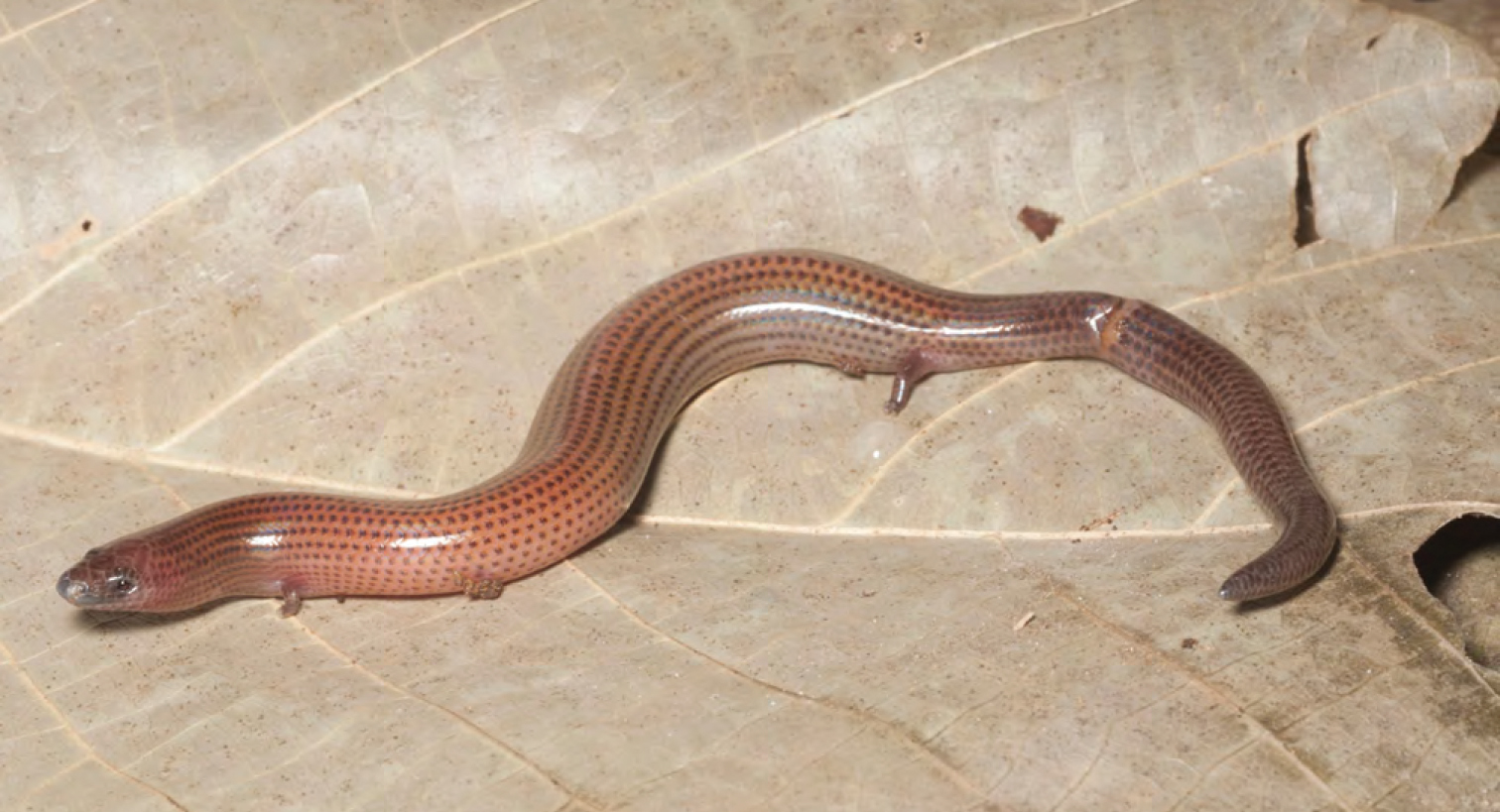

Conservation status
- Least Concern (IUCN 3.1)

Scientific classification
- Kingdom: Animalia
- Phylum: Chordata
- Class: Reptilia
- Order: Squamata
- Family: Scincidae
- Genus: Brachymeles
- Species: B. muntingkamay

Binomial name
- Brachymeles muntingkamay Siler, Rico, Duya, & Brown, 2009

= Brachymeles muntingkamay =

Caraballo Mountains loam-swimming skink

Species of lizard

Brachymeles muntingkamay, the Caraballo Mountains loam-swimming skink, is a species of skink endemic to the Philippines.
