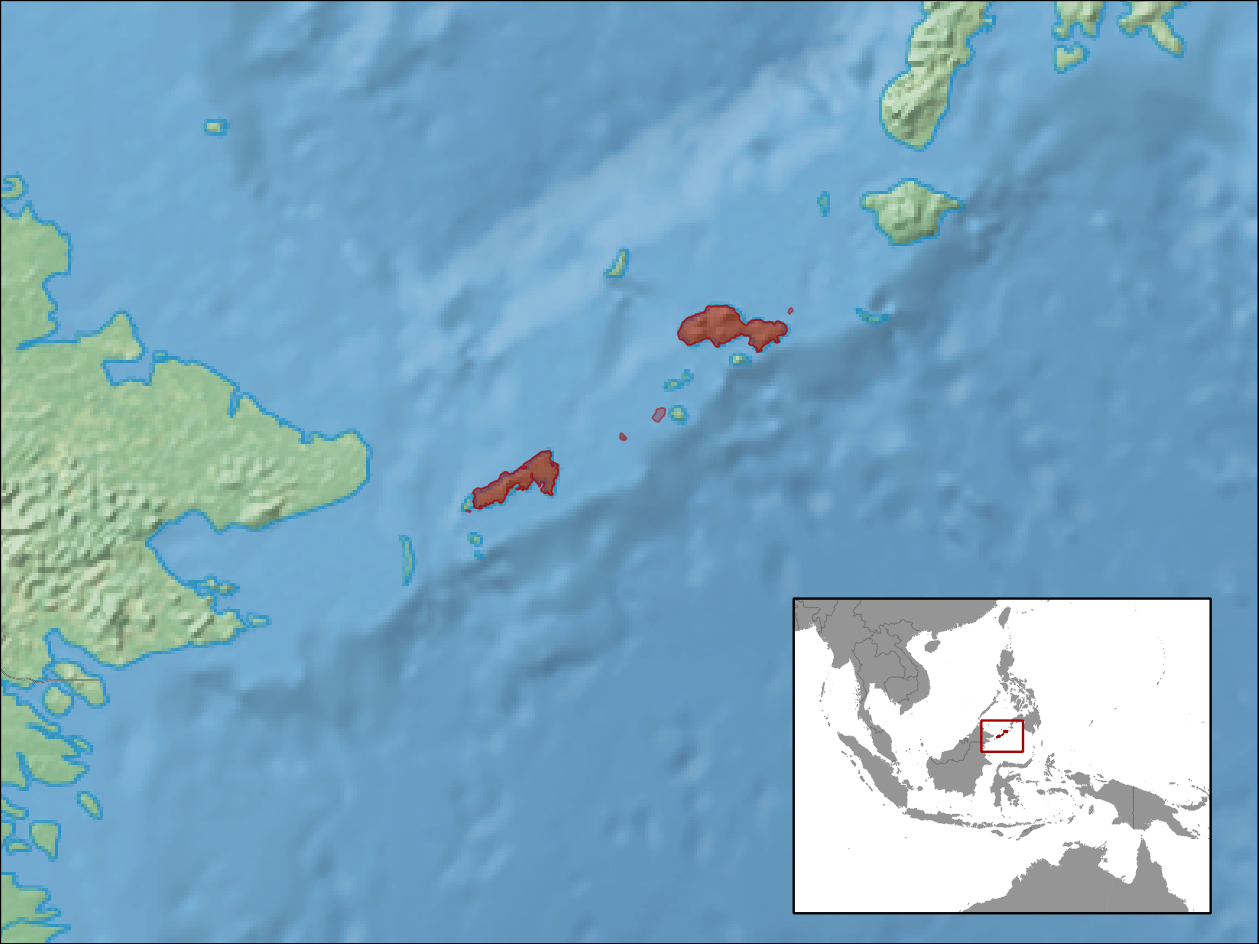
- Brachymeles vermis distribution

Conservation status
- Endangered (IUCN 3.1)

Scientific classification
- Domain: Eukaryota
- Kingdom: Animalia
- Phylum: Chordata
- Class: Reptilia
- Order: Squamata
- Family: Scincidae
- Genus: Brachymeles
- Species: B. vermis

Binomial name
- Brachymeles vermis Taylor, 1918

= Brachymeles vermis =

Taylor's short-legged skink

Species of lizard

Brachymeles vermis, Taylor's short-legged skink, is a species of skink endemic to the Philippines.
