= Brachymeles suluensis =

Graceful short-legged skink

Scientific classification
- Domain: Eukaryota
- Kingdom: Animalia
- Phylum: Chordata
- Class: Reptilia
- Order: Squamata
- Family: Scincidae
- Genus: Brachymeles
- Species: B. suluensis

Binomial name
- Brachymeles suluensis Taylor, 1918

Species of lizard

Brachymeles suluensis, the graceful short-legged skink, is a species of skink endemic to the Philippines.
