= Brachymeles libayani =

Lapinig Islands slender skink

Conservation status
- Least Concern (IUCN 3.1)

Scientific classification
- Kingdom: Animalia
- Phylum: Chordata
- Class: Reptilia
- Order: Squamata
- Family: Scincidae
- Genus: Brachymeles
- Species: B. libayani

Binomial name
- Brachymeles libayani Siler, Fuiten, Jones, Alcala, & Brown, 2011

Species of lizard

Brachymeles libayani, the Lapinig Islands slender skink, is a species of skink endemic to the Philippines.
