= Brachymeles talinis =

Duméril's short-legged skink

Conservation status
- Least Concern (IUCN 3.1)

Scientific classification
- Domain: Eukaryota
- Kingdom: Animalia
- Phylum: Chordata
- Class: Reptilia
- Order: Squamata
- Family: Scincidae
- Genus: Brachymeles
- Species: B. talinis

Binomial name
- Brachymeles talinis Brown, 1956
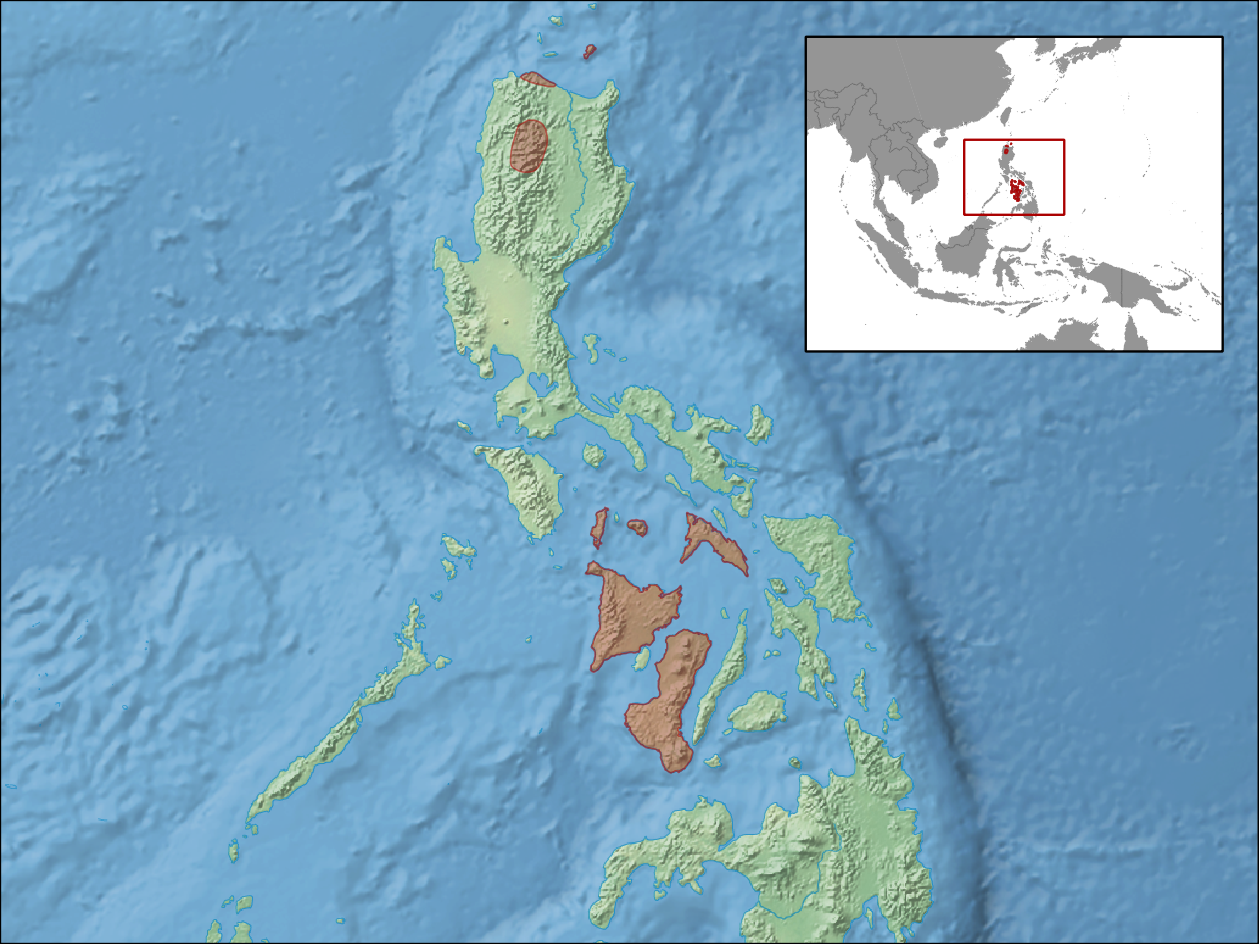

Species of lizard

Brachymeles talinis, Duméril's short-legged skink, is a species of skink endemic to the Philippines.
