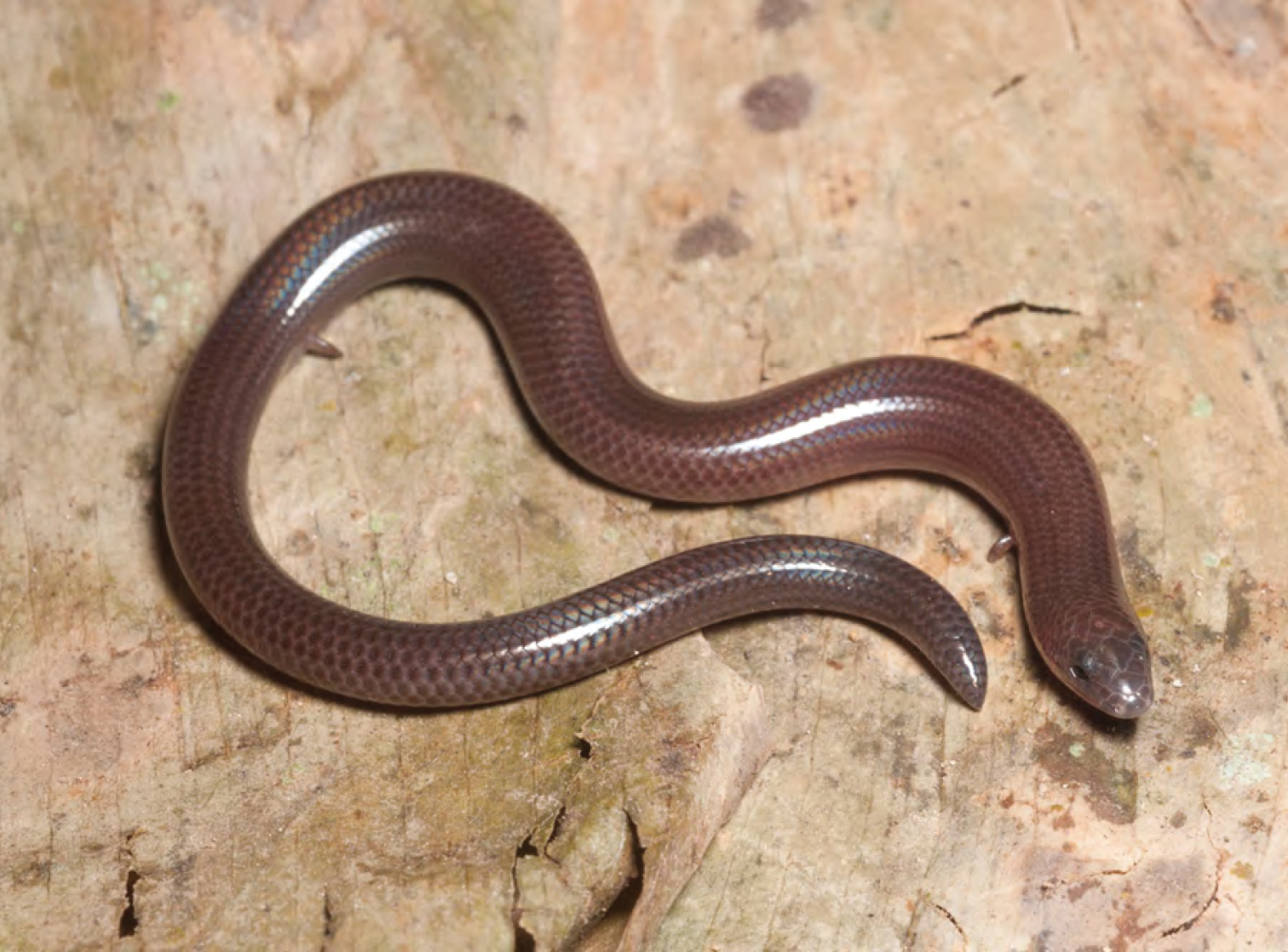

Conservation status
- Least Concern (IUCN 3.1)

Scientific classification
- Kingdom: Animalia
- Phylum: Chordata
- Class: Reptilia
- Order: Squamata
- Family: Scincidae
- Genus: Brachymeles
- Species: B. bonitae

Binomial name
- Brachymeles bonitae A.M.C. Duméril & Bibron, 1839

= Brachymeles bonitae =

Species of lizard

Brachymeles bonitae, commonly known as the stub-limbed burrowing skink or pretty short-legged skink, is a species of skink found in the Philippines. It was first described in 1839 by André Marie Constant Duméril and Gabriel Bibron. It is endemic to the Philippines.

== Description ==
Brachymeles bonitae is a small, elongated lizard with a snout-to-vent length of up to 80 mm (3 in). It is a "non-pentadactyl" species, different populations having a varying number of digits on each tiny limb, normally in the range zero to two. Features that differentiate it from other similar skinks include the 47 to 57 presacral vertebrae and the number of rows of scales present. It has a pineal eye spot. It is a fossorial species and can move through leaf litter and loose soil by "swimming". Adaptations in skinks for this type of lifestyle typically include a wedge-shaped snout, short head, elongated body, reduced limbs and a reduction in the number of digits.

== Distribution and habitat ==
Brachymeles bonitae is endemic to the northern and north-central Philippines where it is found on the islands of Luzon, Polillo Island, Mindoro, Masbate, Calotcot, Tablas Island, Sibuyan Island, Lubang Island, Camiguin and Marinduque at elevations of up to 800 m (2,625 ft) above sea level. Its typical habitat is the floor of moist primary and secondary tropical forest where it is found among the leaf litter or under fallen logs. It is also found in plantations and coconut groves.

== Status ==
Brachymeles bonitae is listed by the IUCN as being of "least concern". This is because it has a wide distribution in the Philippines, its population size appears to be stable and no specific threats have been identified. It seems to be an adaptable species and is found in both primary and secondary forests and in coconut plantations. Severe deforestation would be likely to affect it but it is present in a number of protected areas including the Aurora Memorial National Park.
