= Brachymeles makusog =

Conservation status
- Least Concern (IUCN 3.1)

Scientific classification
- Kingdom: Animalia
- Phylum: Chordata
- Class: Reptilia
- Order: Squamata
- Family: Scincidae
- Genus: Brachymeles
- Species: B. makusog

Binomial name
- Brachymeles makusog Siler, Diesmos, & Brown, 2010

Species of lizard

Brachymeles makusog is a species of skink endemic to the Philippines.
