= Brachymeles vindumi =

Jens's slender skink

Conservation status
- Data Deficient (IUCN 3.1)

Scientific classification
- Kingdom: Animalia
- Phylum: Chordata
- Class: Reptilia
- Order: Squamata
- Family: Scincidae
- Genus: Brachymeles
- Species: B. vindumi

Binomial name
- Brachymeles vindumi Siler & Brown, 2010

Species of lizard

Brachymeles vindumi, Jens's slender skink, is a species of skink endemic to the Philippines.
