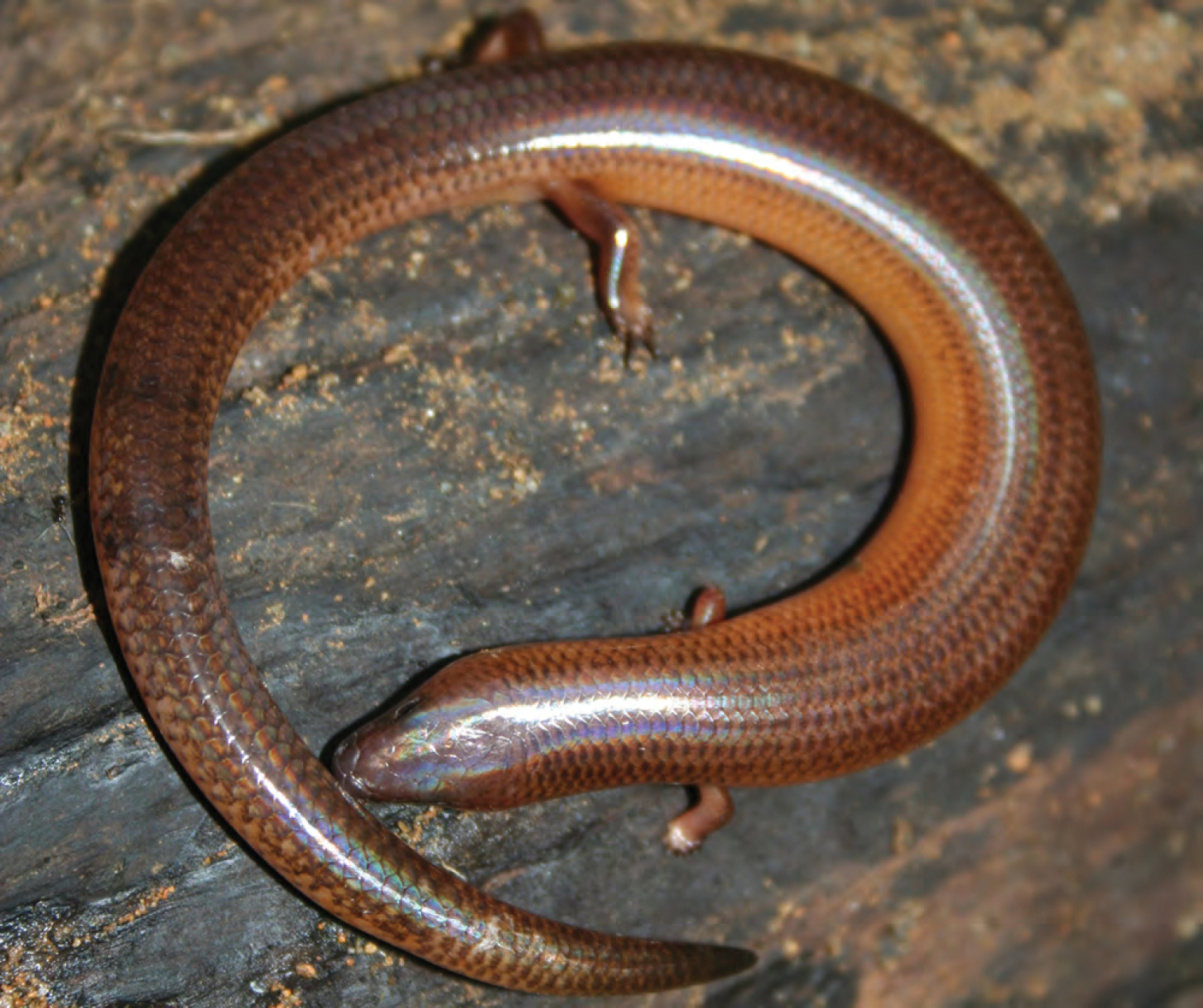

Conservation status
- Least Concern (IUCN 3.1)

Scientific classification
- Kingdom: Animalia
- Phylum: Chordata
- Class: Reptilia
- Order: Squamata
- Family: Scincidae
- Genus: Brachymeles
- Species: B. kadwa

Binomial name
- Brachymeles kadwa Siler & Brown, 2010

= Brachymeles kadwa =

Jessi's slender skink

Species of lizard

Brachymeles kadwa, Jessi's slender skink, is a species of skink endemic to the Philippines.
