= Dioscoro S. Rabor =

Filipino ornithologist, zoologist and conservationist

- Born: May 18, 1911; Cebu City, Philippine Islands
- Died: March 25, 1996 (aged 84); Laguna, Philippines
- Education: University of the Philippines; Yale University
- Spouse: Lina N. Florendo Rabor
- Scientific career
- Fields: Ornithology, Zoology
- Doctoral advisor: Sidney Dillon Ripley
- Notable students: Angel C. Alcala
- Author abbrev. (zoology): Rabor

Dioscoro Siarot Rabor (May 18, 1911–March 25, 1996), also known as Joe Rabor, was a Filipino ornithologist, zoologist, and conservationist. Known as the "Father of Philippine Wildlife Conservation", he led more than 50 wildlife expeditions in the Philippines, authored 87 scientific papers and articles, and described 69 new bird taxa and numerous mammal species.

In 1965, he brought public attention to the endangered status of the Philippine Eagle.

== Biography ==
=== Early life and education ===
Born in Cebu City, Philippines, Rabor studied at the University of the Philippines for his bachelors and masters degrees. He pursued Ph.D. studies at Yale University, where he was advised by ornithologist Sidney Dillon Ripley. In 1974, Silliman University granted him an honorary Sc.D.

=== Career ===
Rabor led many expeditions throughout the Philippine Islands to collect animal specimens, making a significant contribution to knowledge about Philippine wildlife and ecology. He often traveled with his wife, Lina N. Florendo Rabor, and their six children. Over several decades, he visited 25 islands in the Philippines and collected over 60,000 bird specimens. His field collection efforts allowed for the description of many new taxa, including 8 species and 61 subspecies of birds.

He held teaching and research positions at several institutions, including Silliman University; Mindanao State University; and the College of Forestry, University of the Philippines Los Baños.

Beginning in 1965, Rabor called attention to the decline of the Philippine Eagle, an endangered species found only in the forests of the Philippine Islands that faces widespread habitat loss. His efforts to educate people around the world about the challenges facing the Philippine Eagle helped spur the involvement of Peace Corps volunteers in Philippine Eagle conservation projects. One of the volunteers, ornithologist Robert Kennedy, returned to the Philippines to continue working on eagle conservation and awareness efforts, including successfully lobbying to change the name of the species from the "Monkey-eating Eagle." Kennedy and colleagues named Lina's Sunbird (Aethopyga linaraborae) after Lina Rabor.

== Awards and recognition ==
- Fulbright Research Fellowship, Field Museum of Natural History
- Guggenheim Fellowship, Organismic Biology & Ecology (1950)
- Research Associate, Field Museum of Natural History
- Research Associate, Yale Peabody Museum
- Research Associate, Smithsonian National Museum of Natural History
- Research Associate, Denver Museum of Nature and Science
- Research Associate, Bernice P. Bishop Museum
- Corresponding Fellow, American Ornithologists' Union
- Guggenheim Fellowship, Organismic Biology & Ecology (1956)
- Research Fellowship in Zoology, Yale University (1957-1958)
- Research Fellowship in Zoology, Chicago Natural History Museum (1957-1958)
- United Board for Christian Higher Education in Asia (1957-1958)
- Research Grantee, Frank M. Chapman Memorial Fund (1962,1963-1964)
- Travel Grantee, International Council for Bird Preservation (1962)
- Research Grantee, Yale University (1962)
- Travel Grantee, 1st World Conference on National Parks in Seattle, Washington (1962)
- Travel Grantee, 13th International Ornithological Congress in Cornell University, New York (1962)
- Honorary Research Associate Smithsonian Institution, Washington, DC. (1963)
- Honorary Curator in Ornithology in the National Museum of the Philippines (1964)
- Member of the Planning Committee of the following International Ornithological Congresses:

- XIV, Oxford (1966)
- XV, The Hague (1970)
- XVI, Canberra (1974)

== Eponyms ==
Rabor is commemorated in the scientific name of a species of Philippine lizard, Lipinia rabori.

== See also ==
- List of Guggenheim Fellowships awarded in 1950
