= List of threatened species of the Philippines =

This is a list of threatened plant and animal species in the Philippines as classified by the International Union for Conservation of Nature (IUCN). It includes vulnerable (VU), endangered (EN), critically endangered (CR), and recently extinct (EX) species. It excludes near threatened (NT), data deficient (DD), and prehistoric species.

== Animals ==
The following is a list of animal species classified as threatened:

=== Vulnerable ===
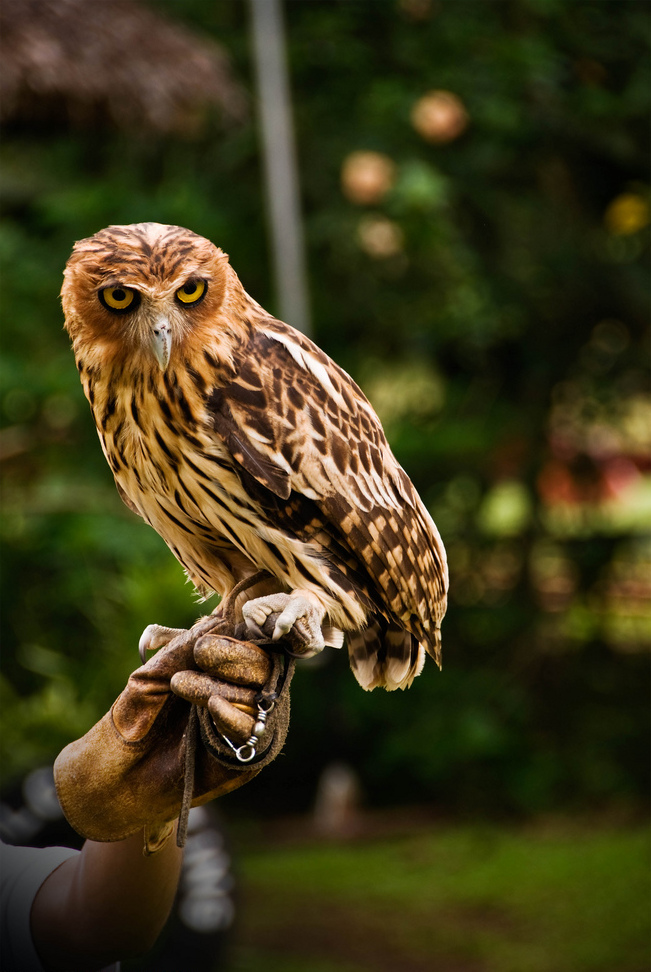
Philippine eagle-owl (Bubo philippensis)

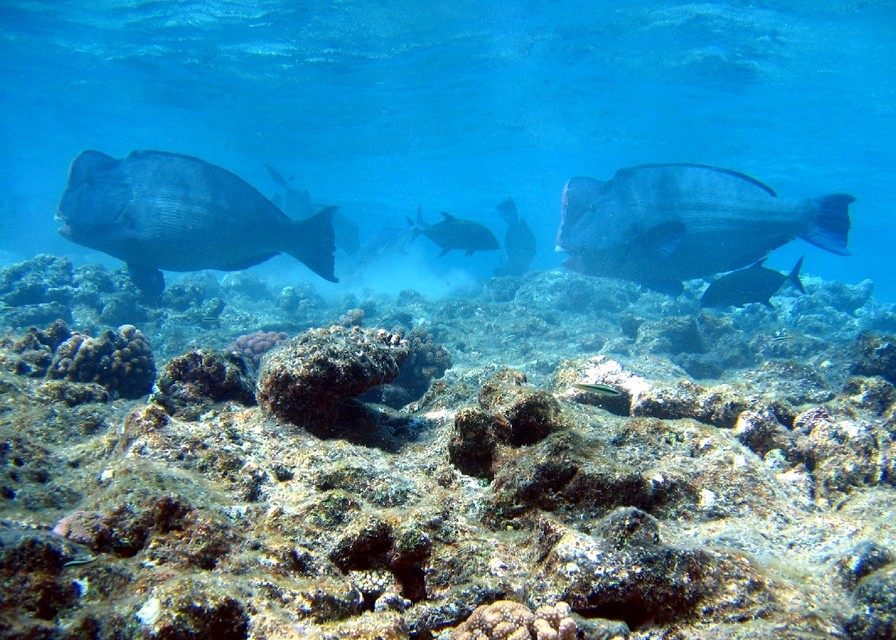
Green humphead parrotfish (Bolbometopon muricatum)

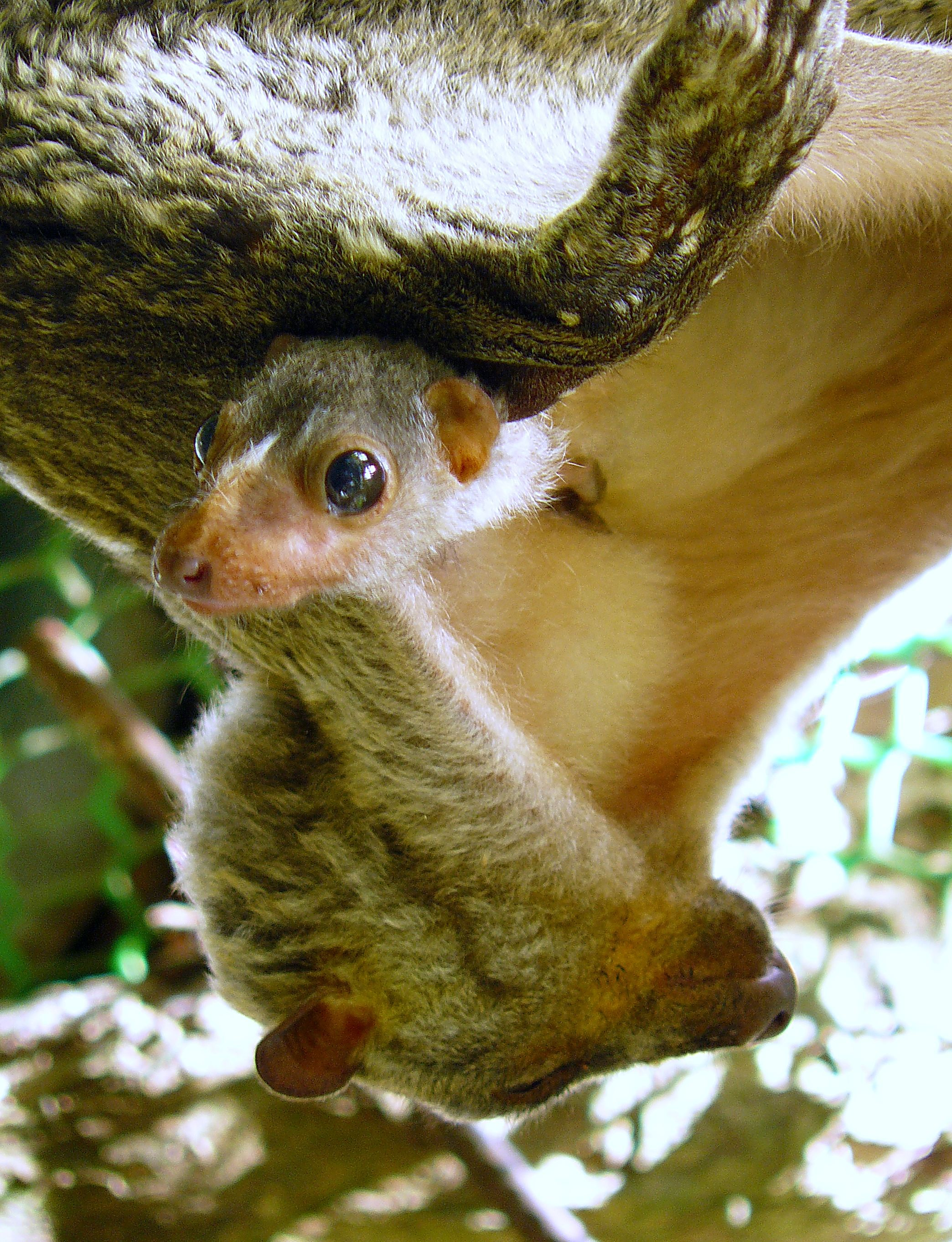
A baby Philippine flying lemur (Cynocephalus volans) with mother

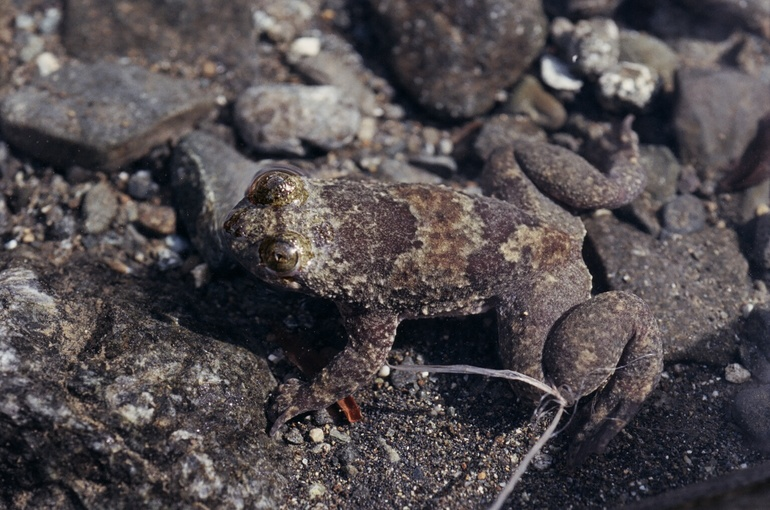
Philippine flat-headed frog (Barbourula busuangensis)

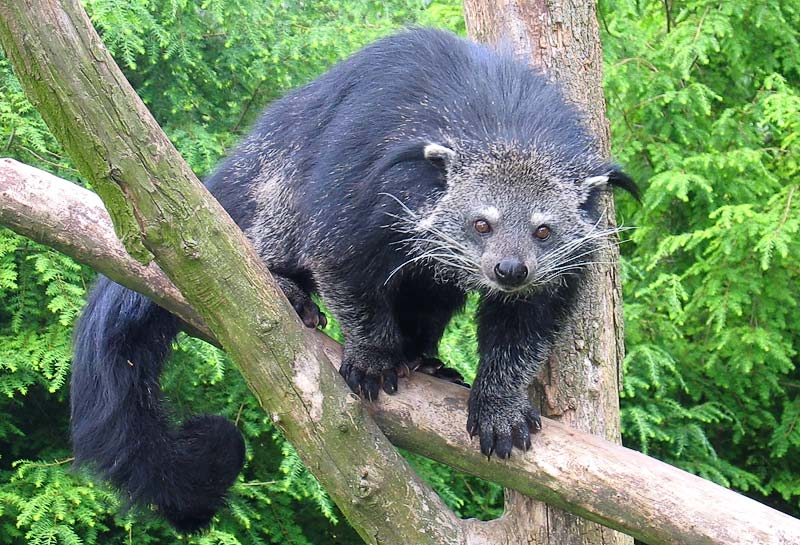
Binturong (Arctictis binturong)

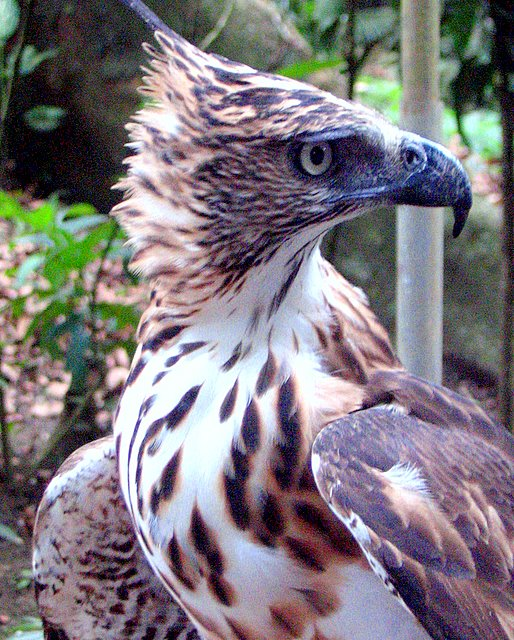
Philippine hawk-eagle (Nisaetus philippensis)

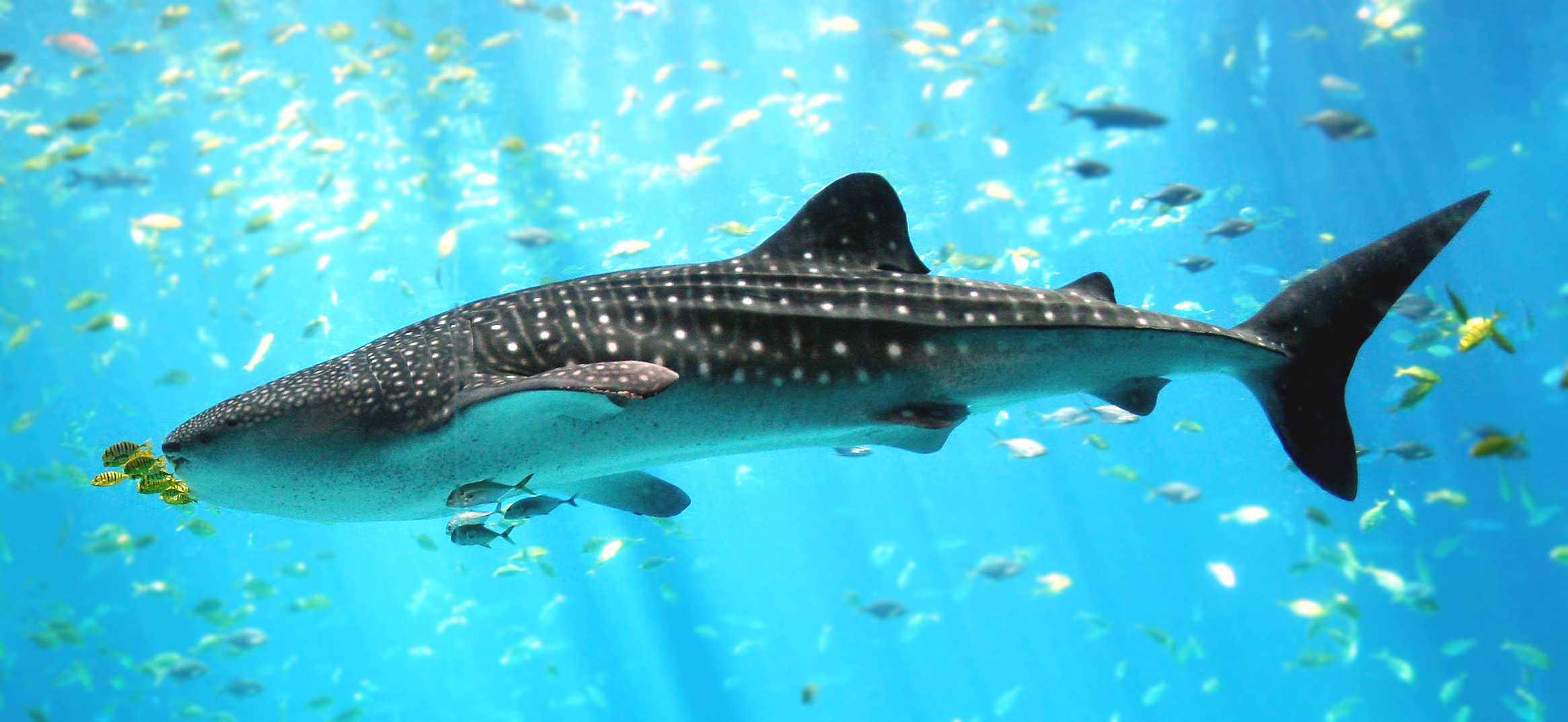
Whale shark (Rhincodon typus)

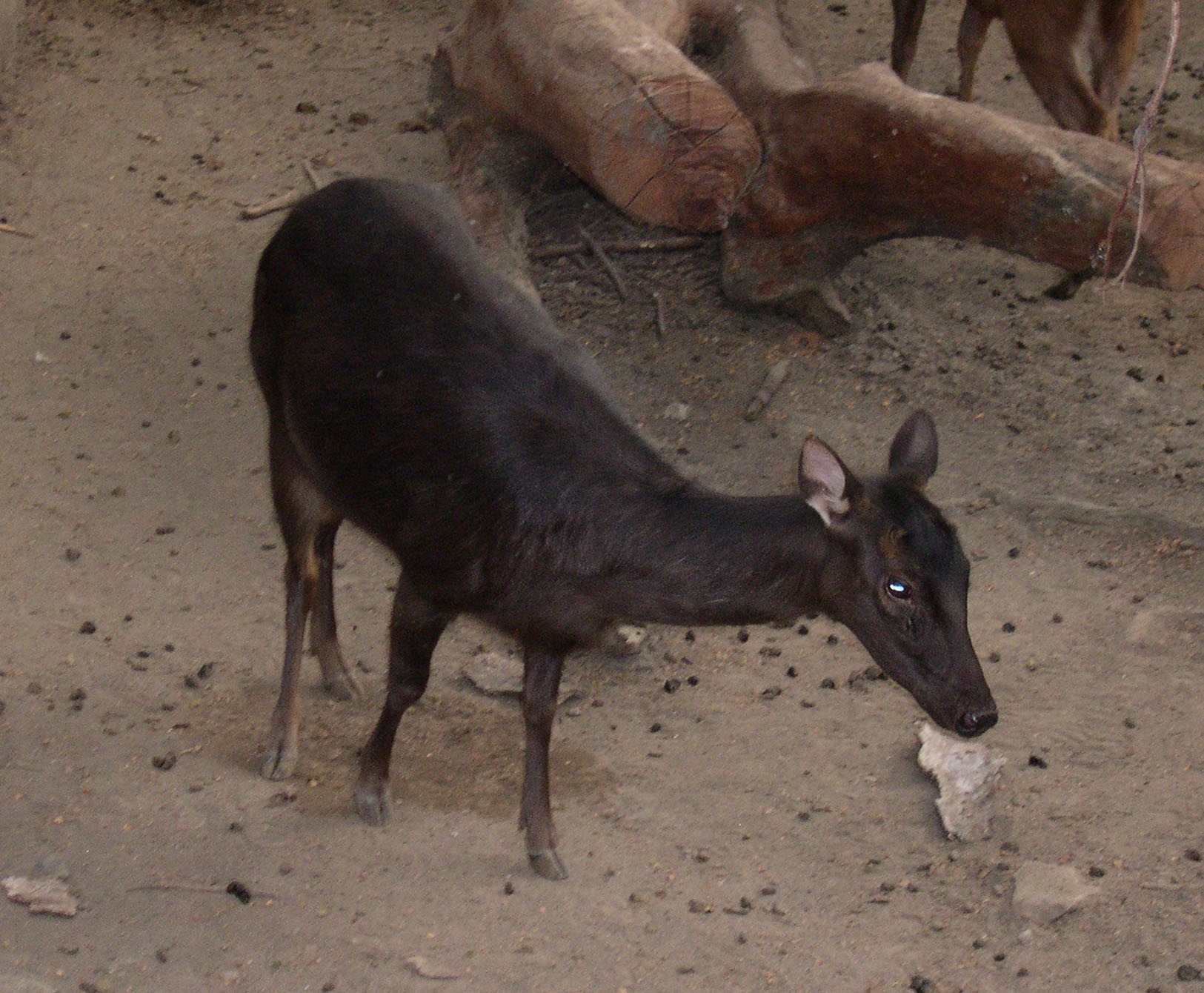
Philippine deer (Rusa marianna)

Scientific name	Common name(s)	Local name(s)	Distribution	Order
Acanthastrea spp.			Native to the Indian Ocean and the western Pacific Ocean	Scleractinia
Acerodon leucotis	Palawan flying fox		Endemic to Palawan and neighboring islands	Chiroptera
Acrocephalus sorghophilus	Streaked reed-warbler		Native to China, Taiwan, and the Philippines	Passeriformes
Acropora spp.	Table corals		Native to the Indian Ocean and the western Pacific Ocean	Scleractinia
Actenoides hombroni	Blue-capped kingfisher		Endemic to Mindanao	Coraciiformes
Aetomylaeus nichofii	Banded eagle ray		Native to the Indian Ocean and the western Pacific Ocean	Myliobatiformes
Aioliops brachypterus			Endemic to Miniloc Island and El Nido Island	Perciformes
Alionycteris paucidentata	Mindanao pygmy fruit bat		Endemic to the Philippines	Chiroptera
Alveopora spp.			Native to the Indian Ocean and the western Pacific Ocean	Scleractinia
Anacropora spp.	Briar corals		Native to the Indian Ocean and the western Pacific Ocean	Scleractinia
Ansonia mcgregori			Endemic to Mindanao	Anura
Ansonia muelleri			Endemic to Mindanao and Dinagat Island	Anura
Anthracoceros marchei	Palawan hornbill		Endemic to the Palawan archipelago	Coraciiformes
Anas luzonica	Philippine duck		Endemic to the Philippines	Anseriformes
Anonymomys mindorensis	Mindoro climbing rat		Endemic to the Philippines	Rodentia
Aonyx cinerea	Asian small-clawed otter		Found in Palawan in the Philippines. Native to South Asia and Southeast Asia	Carnivora
Apomys gracilirostris	Large Mindoro forest mouse		Endemic to Mindoro	Rodentia
Apomys sacobianus	Long-nosed Luzon forest mouse		Endemic to the Philippines	Rodentia
Aptenorallus calayanensis	Calayan rail	Piding	Endemic to Calayan Island	Gruiformes
Archboldomys luzonensis	Mt. Isarog shrew-mouse		Endemic to Mt. Isarog, Camarines Sur	Rodentia
Arctictis binturong	Binturong	Binturong	Found in Palawan in the Philippines. Native to South Asia and Southeast Asia	Carnivora
Astreopora spp.	Star corals		Native to the Indian Ocean and the western Pacific Ocean	Scleractinia
Atherinomorus lineatus	Lined silverside		Native to Indonesia and the Philippines	Atheriniformes
Atrophaneura atropos			Endemic to the Philippines	Lepidoptera
Atrophaneura schadenbergi			Endemic to the Philippines	Lepidoptera
Australogyra zelli			Native to the eastern Indian Ocean and the western Pacific Ocean	Scleractinia
Barbourula busuangensis	Philippine flat-headed frog		Endemic to Busuanga, Culion, and Palawan	Anura
Bolbometopon muricatum	Humphead parrotfish		Native to the Indian Ocean and the Pacific Ocean	Perciformes
Boroda expatria			Endemic to Lake Manguao, Palawan	Perciformes
Bubo philippensis	Philippine eagle-owl	Kuwago, Bukao, Búho Filipino	Endemic to the Philippines	Strigiformes
Bullimus gamay	Camiguin forest rat		Endemic to Camiguin	Rodentia
Carcharhinus longimanus	Oceanic whitetip shark		Global	Lamniformes
Carcharodon carcharias	Great white shark		Global	Lamniformes
Catalaphyllia jardinei			Native to the Indian Ocean and the western Pacific Ocean	Scleractinia
Caulastrea curvata			Native to the eastern Indian Ocean and the western Pacific Ocean	Scleractinia
Caulastrea echinulata			Native to the eastern Indian Ocean and the western Pacific Ocean	Scleractinia
Centrophorus squamosus	Deepwater spiny dogfish		Old World	Squaliformes
Ceyx melanurus	Philippine dwarf kingfisher		Endemic to the eastern Philippines	Coraciiformes
Chloropsis flavipennis	Philippine leafbird		Endemic to Samar, Leyte, and Mindanao. Presumed extinct on Cebu	Passeriformes
Coeliccia exoleta			Endemic to Mindanao and Camiguin	Odonata
Coracina mindanensis	Black-bibbed cicadabird		Endemic to the Philippines	Passeriformes
Coracina ostenta	White-winged cuckooshrike		Endemic to Panay, Guimaras, and Negros Island	Passeriformes
Cromileptes altivelis	Pantherfish, humpback grouper	Lapu-lapu, Tabadlo, Salingukod, Labungan, Señorita, Baraka	Native to South Asia, Southeast Asia, East Asia, and Oceania	Perciformes
Crunomys melanius	Mindanao shrew rat		Endemic to Camiguin, Leyte, and Mindanao	Rodentia
Cynocephalus volans	Philippine flying lemur	Kagwang	Endemic to Bohol, Samar, Leyte, Mindanao, and neighboring islands	Dermoptera
Cyphastrea agassizi			Native to the eastern Indian Ocean and the western and central Pacific Ocean	Scleractinia
Cyphastrea ocellina			Native to the eastern Indian Ocean and the western and central Pacific Ocean	Scleractinia
Dasia griffini	Griffin's keel-scaled tree skink		Endemic to Palawan and Mindoro	Squamata
Dendrocopos ramsayi	Sulu pygmy woodpecker		Endemic to the Sulu Archipelago	Piciformes
Dicaeum haematostictum	Visayan flowerpecker		Endemic to Western Visayas and Negros	Passeriformes
Dicaeum retrocinctum	Scarlet-collared flowerpecker		Endemic to Mindoro	Passeriformes
Dipsastraea laddi			Native to the eastern Indian Ocean and the western Pacific Ocean	Scleractinia
Draco mindanensis	Mindanao flying dragon	Tabili	Endemic to Dinagat, Leyte, Mindanao and Samar.	Squamata
Drepanosticta centrosaurus			Endemic to Surigao del Sur and Davao Oriental	Odonata
Dryocalamus philippinus			Endemic to the Philippines	Squamata
Dryophiops philippina			Endemic to the Philippines	Squamata
Ducula carola	Spotted imperial pigeon		Endemic to the Philippines	Columbiformes
Ducula pickeringii	Grey imperial-pigeon		Endemic to Palawan, Mindanao and the Sulu archipelago	Columbiformes
Dugong dugon	Dugong	Baboy-dagat, Duyon, Dugong	Tropical waters of the Indian and Western Pacific Ocean	Sirenia
Echinophyllia costata			Native to the eastern Indian Ocean and the western Pacific Ocean	Scleractinia
Echinopora ashmorensis			Native to the eastern Indian Ocean and the western Pacific Ocean	Scleractinia
Ecsenius kurti			Endemic to the northern Sulu Sea	Perciformes
Egretta eulophotes	Chinese egret		Native to Southeast Asia and East Asia	Ciconiiformes
Emberiza sulphurata	Yellow bunting		Native to China, Japan, Korea, Taiwan, wintering in the Philippines	Passeriformes
Epinephelus bruneus	Kelp grouper	Lapu-lapu	Native to China, Vietnam, Japan, Korea, Taiwan, and the Philippines	Perciformes
Epinephelus lanceolatus	Brindled grouper	Lapu-lapu, Bantol, Kugtung, Pugapo	Native to the eastern Indian Ocean and the western and central Pacific Ocean	Perciformes
Erythrura viridifacies	Green-faced parrotfinch		Endemic to Luzon, Panay, and Negros Island	Passeriformes
Euphyllia spp.			Native to the Indian Ocean and the western Pacific Ocean	Scleractinia
Eurylaimus samarensis	Visayan broadbill		Endemic to Eastern Visayas	Passeriformes
Eurylaimus steerii	Mindanao broadbill		Endemic to Mindanao, Dinagat, Siargao and Basilan	Passeriformes
Favites spinosa			Native to the Indian Ocean and the western Pacific Ocean	Scleractinia
Ficedula basilanica	Little slaty flycatcher		Endemic to Samar, Leyte, Dinagat, Mindanao and Basilan	Passeriformes
Ficedula platenae	Palawan flycatcher		Endemic to Palawan	Passeriformes
Fungia spp.			Native to the eastern Indian Ocean and the western Pacific Ocean	Scleractinia
Galaxea spp.			Native to the Indian Ocean and the western Pacific Ocean	Scleractinia
Gallicolumba platenae	Mindoro bleeding-heart	Kulo-kulo	Endemic to Mindoro	Columbiformes
Gekko ernstkelleri			Endemic to Panay	Squamata
Gekko gigante	Gigante narrow-disked gecko		Endemic to the Gigantes Islands, Carles, Iloilo	Squamata
Glaucostegus granulatus	Sharpnose Guitarfish		Native to South Asia and Southeast Asia	Rajiformes
Goniastrea spp.			Native to the Indian Ocean and the western Pacific Ocean	Scleractinia
Goniopora spp.			Native to the Indian Ocean and the western Pacific Ocean	Scleractinia
Graphium idaeoides			Endemic to the Philippines	Lepidoptera
Graphium megaera			Endemic to the Philippines	Lepidoptera
Grus antigone	Sarus crane		Extinct in the Philippines. Native to South Asia, Southeast Asia, and Northern Australia	Gruiformes
Gynacantha constricta			Endemic to Laguna, Luzon	Odonata
Haeromys pusillus	Lesser Ranee mouse		Possibly extinct in the Philippines. Native to Indonesia and Malaysia	Rodentia
Halomitra clavator			Native to Papua New Guinea, Indonesia, Solomon Islands, and the Philippines	Scleractinia
Heliofungia actiniformis			Native to the eastern Indian Ocean and the western Pacific Ocean	Scleractinia
Heliopora coerulea	Blue coral		Native to the Indian Ocean and the western Pacific Ocean	Scleractinia
Hemigaleus microstoma	Sickle fin weasel shark		Native to the Indian Ocean and the western Pacific Ocean	Carcharhiniformes
Hemipristis elongata	Snaggletooth shark		Native to the Indian Ocean and the western Pacific Ocean	Carcharhiniformes
Hippocampus barbouri	Barbour's seahorse		Native to Indonesia, Malaysia, and the Philippines	Syngnathiformes
Hippocampus comes	Tiger tail seahorse		Native to Southeast Asia	Syngnathiformes
Hippocampus kuda	Common seahorse		Native to the eastern Indian Ocean and the western Pacific Ocean	Syngnathiformes
Hippocampus spinosissimus	Hedgehog seahorse		Native to the Indian Ocean and the western Pacific Ocean	Syngnathiformes
Hippocampus trimaculatus	Three-spot seahorse		Native to the Indian Ocean and the western Pacific Ocean	Syngnathiformes
Hydrophis semperi	Lake Taal snake		Endemic to Lake Taal	Squamata
Hydrosaurus pustulatus	Crested lizard	Soa-soa	Endemic to the northern and central Philippines	Squamata
Hylarana igorota			Endemic to Cordillera Central, Luzon	Anura
Hylarana tipanan			Endemic to the Sierra Madres of Luzon	Anura
Hypothymis coelestis	Celestial blue monarch		Endemic to the Philippines	Passeriformes
Hystrix pumila	Philippine porcupine		Endemic to Palawan	Rodentia
Idea electra	Electra's tree-nymph		Endemic to the Philippines	Lepidoptera
Isopora spp.			Native to the Indian Ocean and the western Pacific Ocean	Scleractinia
Isurus oxyrinchus	Shortfin Mako		Global	Lamniformes
Kaloula kalingensis	Kalinga narrowmouth toad		Endemic to northern Luzon, Polillo, and Palaui	Anura
Kaloula rigida	Luzon narrowmouth toad		Endemic to northern Luzon	Anura
Lepidochelys olivacea	Olive ridley		Global	Testudines
Leptastrea aequalis			Native to the Indian Ocean and the western Pacific Ocean	Scleractinia
Leptoria irregularis			Native to the Indian Ocean and the western and central Pacific Ocean	Scleractinia
Leptoseris spp.			Native to the Indian Ocean and the western and central Pacific Ocean	Scleractinia
Limnonectes acanthi			Endemic to Balabac, Busuanga, Culion and Palawan	Anura
Limnonectes diuatus			Endemic to the Diuata Mountains and Mount Kitanglad in Mindanao	Anura
Limnonectes parvus			Endemic to Mindanao	Anura
Limnonectes visayanus			Endemic to Masbate, Cebu, Negros Island, Guimaras, Panay and Siquijor	Anura
Lobophyllia spp.			Native to the eastern Indian Ocean and the western Pacific Ocean	Scleractinia
Luzonargiolestes realensis			Endemic to Quezon Province on Luzon	Odonata
Mainitia mainitensis			Endemic to Lake Mainit, Mindanao	Decapoda
Ptenochirus wetmorei	White-collared fruit bat		Native to Indonesia, Malaysia, and the Philippines	Chiroptera
Megaptera novaeangliae	Humpback whale	Balyena	Global, stable presence in northern Luzon	Cetacea
Megophrys stejnegeri	Mindanao horned frog		Endemic to Basilan, Biliran, Bohol, Dinagat, Leyte, Samar, and Mindanao	Anura
Millepora foveolata			Native to the western Pacific Ocean	Milleporina
Montastraea spp.			Native to the eastern Indian Ocean and the western Pacific Ocean	Scleractinia
Montipora spp.			Native to the Indian Ocean and the western Pacific Ocean	Scleractinia
Moseleya latistellata			Native to the eastern Indian Ocean and the western Pacific Ocean	Scleractinia
Muscicapa randi	Ashy-breasted flycatcher		Endemic to Luzon, Negros Island	Passeriformes
Mycedium steeni			Native to the eastern Indian Ocean and the western Pacific Ocean	Scleractinia
Mydaus marchei	Palawan stink badger		Endemic to Palawan and Busuanga	Carnivora
Nebrius ferrugineus	Tawny nurse shark		Native to the Indian Ocean and the western Pacific Ocean	Orectolobiformes
Nemenzophyllia turbida			Native to the eastern Indian Ocean and the western Pacific Ocean	Scleractinia
Nemipterus virgatus	Golden threadfin bream		Native to the eastern Indian Ocean and the western Pacific Ocean	Perciformes
Nisaetus philippensis	Philippine hawk-eagle	Aguila-azor Filipina	Endemic to Luzon	Falconiformes
Otopteropus cartilagonodus	Luzon fruit bat		Endemic to the Philippines	Chiroptera
Otus gurneyi	Giant scops-owl, lesser eagle-owl	Kuwago, Búho De Mindanao	Endemic to Samar, Dinagat, Siargao and Mindanao	Strigiformes
Phapitreron brunneiceps	Mindanao brown dove		Endemic to Mindanao and Basilan	Columbiformes
Physeter macrocephalus	Sperm whale		Global	Cetacea
Pteropus pumilus	Little golden-mantled flying fox		Endemic to Visayas, Western Mindanao, and some islands in Indonesia	Chiroptera
Pteropus speciosus	Philippine gray flying fox		Endemic to a few islands in Mindanao and Borneo	Chiroptera
Ptilinopus marchei	Flame-breasted fruit dove		Endemic to Luzon	Columbiformes
Rattus mindorensis	Mindoro black rat		Endemic to the Philippines	Rodentia
Rattus tawitawiensis	Tawi-tawi forest rat		Endemic to the Philippines	Rodentia
Rhincodon typus	Whale shark	Butanding, Balilan, Taluki, Tawiki	Tropical waters worldwide; Donsol, Pasacao and Batangas in the Philippines	Orectolobiformes
Rhinolophus subrufus	Small rufous horseshoe bat		Endemic to the Philippines	Chiroptera
Rhynchomys isarogensis	Isarog shrew rat		Endemic to Mt. Isarog, Camarines Sur	Rodentia
Rusa marianna	Philippine deer	Usa	Native and threatened in the Philippines. Introduced and common in Guam	Artiodactyla
Squalus montalbani	Philippine spurdog		Philippines, Indonesia, and tropical Australia	Squaliformes
Sundasciurus rabori	Palawan montane squirrel		Endemic to the Philippines	Rodentia
Sundasciurus samarensis	Samar squirrel		Endemic to the Philippines	Rodentia
Sus ahoenobarbus	Palawan bearded pig		Endemic to Balabac, Palawan and the Calamian Islands	Artiodactyla
Sus philippensis	Philippine warty pig		Endemic to Luzon and neighboring islands	Artiodactyla
Tarsomys echinatus	Spiny long-footed rat		Endemic to the Philippines	Rodentia
Tupaia palawanensis	Palawan treeshrew		Endemic to the Philippines	Scandentia
Tryphomys adustus	Luzon short-nosed rat		Endemic to the Philippines	Rodentia
Turnix worcesteri	Worcester's buttonquail	Pugo	Endemic to Luzon	Charadriiformes
Urogale everetti	Mindanao treeshrew		Endemic to Mindanao and adjacent small islands	Scandentia
Varanus olivaceus	Gray's monitor	Butaan	Endemic to eastern Luzon Catanduanes Polillo and adjacent islands	Squamata

=== Endangered ===
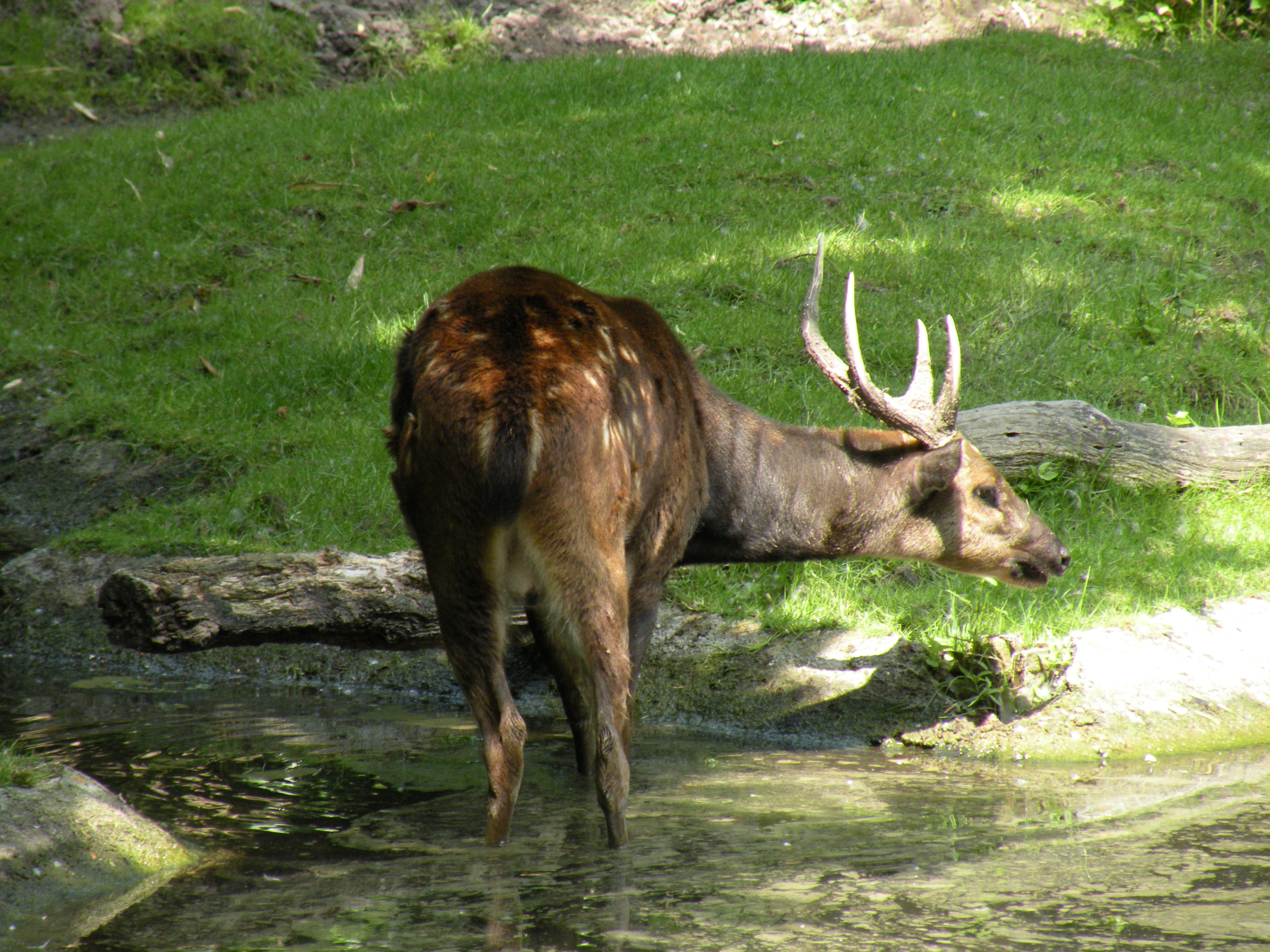
Philippine spotted deer (Rusa alfredi)

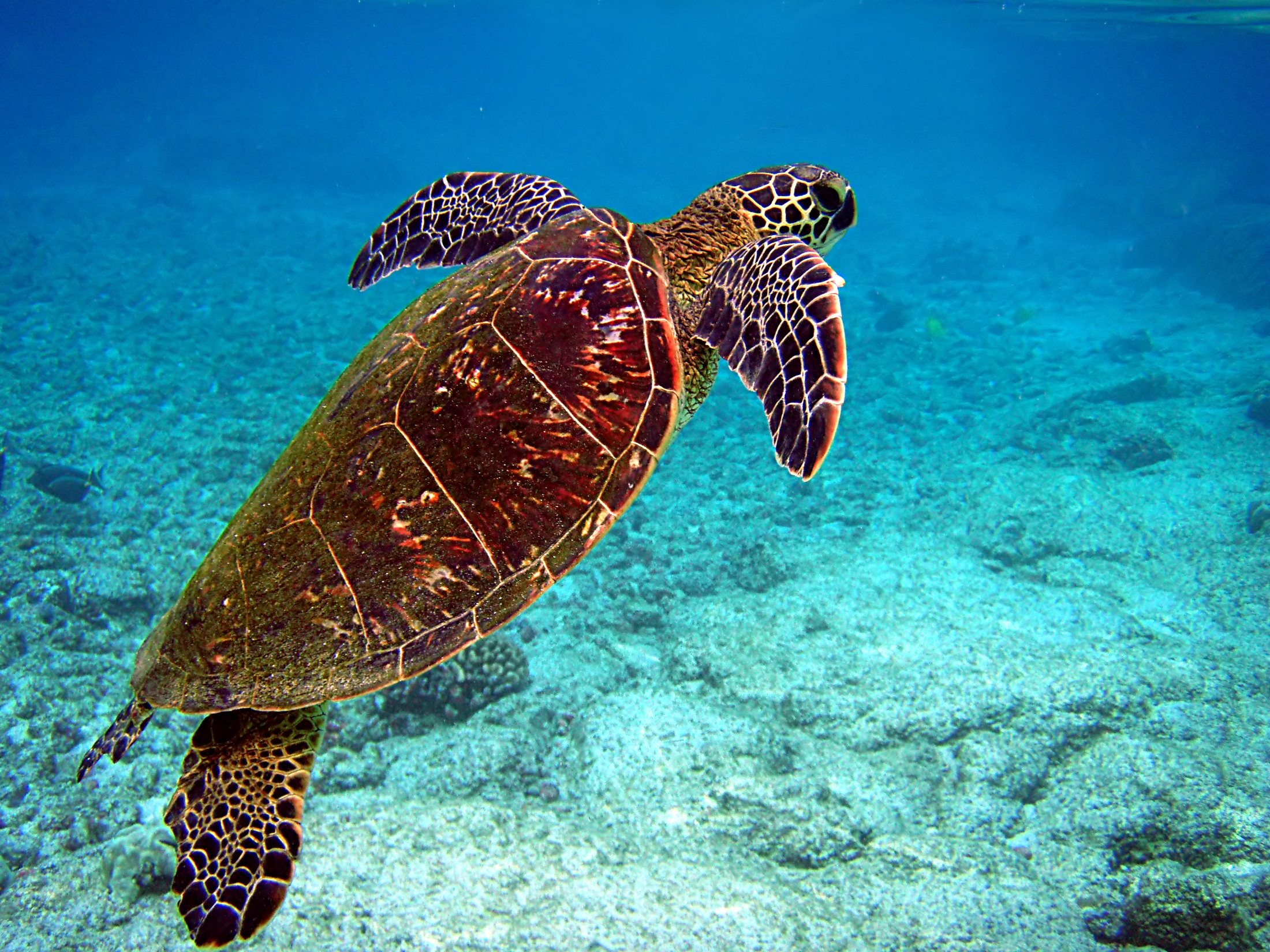
Green turtle (Chelonia mydas)

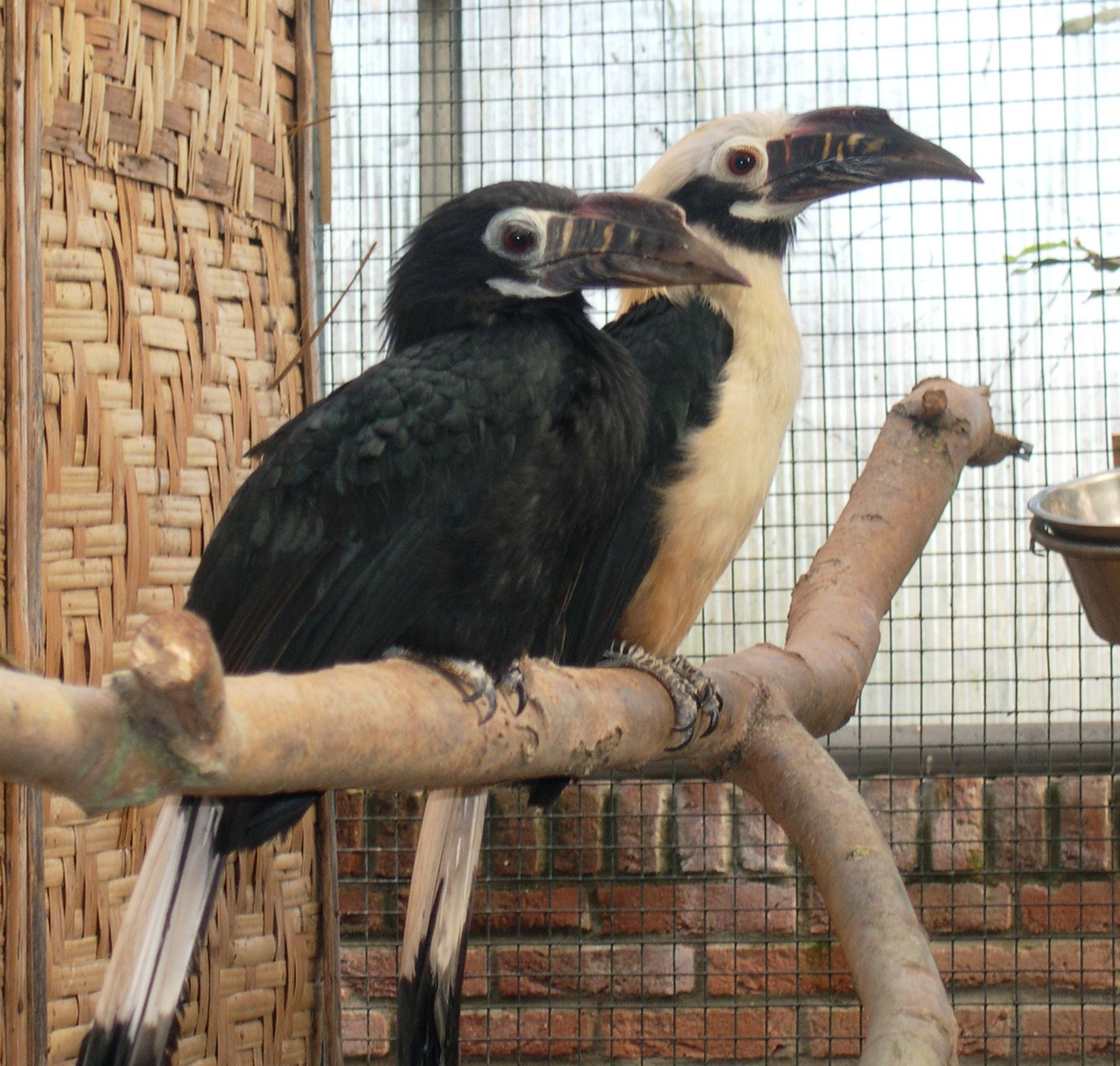
A male and female tarictic hornbill (Penelopides panini)

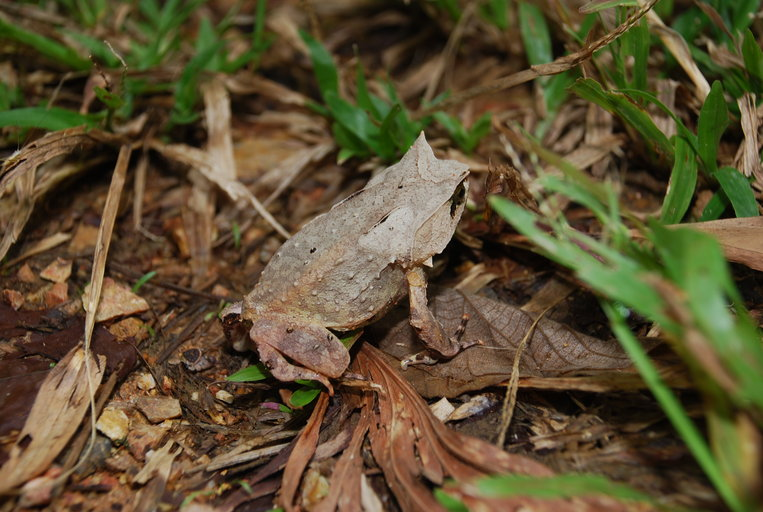
Palawan horned frog (Megophrys ligayae)

Scientific name	Common name(s)	Local name(s)	Distribution	Order
Acerodon jubatus	Giant golden-crowned flying fox, golden-capped fruit bat		Endemic to the Philippines	Chiroptera
Alveopora excelsa	Net coral		Native to the eastern Indian Ocean and the western Pacific Ocean	Scleractinia
Alveopora minuta			Native to the eastern Indian Ocean and the western Pacific Ocean	Scleractinia
Anacropora spinosa			Native to the eastern Indian Ocean and the western Pacific Ocean	Scleractinia
Balaenoptera borealis	Sei whale		Global	Cetacea
Balaenoptera musculus	Blue whale	Balyena	Global	Cetacea
Balaenoptera physalus	Fin whale		Global	Cetacea
Batomys russatus	Russet batomys, Dinagat hairy-tailed rat		Endemic to Dinagat Island	Rodentia
Brachymeles makusog	Loam swimming skink		Endemic to Catanduanes Island and some parts of Bicol Region	Squamata
Brachymeles vermis	Limbless worm skink		Endemic to Sulu Archipelago	Squamata
Caretta caretta	Loggerhead		Global	Testudines
Cerberus microlepis	Dog-faced water snake		Endemic to Lake Buhi and Lake Manapao of the Bicol Peninsula	Squamata
Cheilinus undulatus	Humphead wrasse	Mameng	Native to the Indian Ocean and Pacific Ocean	Perciformes
Chelonia mydas	Green turtle	Pawikan	Global	Testudines
Copsychus cebuensis	Black shama		Endemic to Cebu	Passeriformes
Crateromys heaneyi	Panay cloudrunner, Panay crateromys		Endemic to Panay	Rodentia
Crocidura mindorus	Mindoro shrew		Endemic to Mindoro	Eulipotyphla
Crocidura negrina	Negros shrew		Endemic to Negros Island	Eulipotyphla
Dasycrotapha speciosa	Flame-templed babbler		Endemic to Panay and Negros Island	Passeriformes
Desmalopex leucoptera	White-winged flying fox		Endemic to the Philippines	Chiroptera
Drepanosticta ceratophora			Endemic to Palawan and Balabac	Odonata
Ducula mindorensis	Mindoro imperial pigeon, Mindoro zone-tailed pigeon		Endemic to Mindoro	Columbiformes
Gorsachius goisagi	Japanese night-heron		Native to Japan, China, Taiwan, and the Philippines	Pelecaniformes
Graphium sandawanum	Apo swallowtail		Endemic to the Philippines	Lepidoptera
Hemicordulia apoensis			Endemic to Mount Apo, Mindanao	Odonata
Hemitriakis leucoperiptera	Whitefin topeshark		Endemic to the Philippines	Carcharhiniformes
Heosemys spinosa	Sunburst turtle, spiny terrapin, spiny turtle,		Native to Brunei Darussalam, Indonesia, Malaysia, Thailand, Singapore and the Philippines	Testudines
Hologerrhum dermali			Endemic to Panay	Squamata
Hydnophora bonsai	Spine coral		Native to Japan, Taiwan, China, Indonesia, Vietnam, and the Philippines	Scleractinia
Hyelaphus calamianensis	Calamian deer, Calamian hog deer,		Endemic to the Calamian Group of Islands of Palawan	Artiodactyla
Hylarana mangyanum			Endemic to Mindoro and Sibay	Anura
Ixos siquijorensis	Streak-breasted bulbul		Endemic to the Philippines	Passeriformes
Kaloula kokacii	Catanduanes narrow-mouthed frog	Taplang bukid	Endemic to Catanduanes Island and some parts of Bicol region	Anura
Lithophyllon ranjithi			Native to Indonesia, Malaysia, and the Philippines	Scleractinia
Lobophyllia serratus			Native to the eastern Indian Ocean and the western Pacific Ocean	Scleractinia
Luperosaurus joloensis	Jolo flapped-legged gecko		Endemic to Mindanao and Jolo	Squamata
Luperosaurus macgregori	McGregor's flapped-legged gecko		Endemic to the Babuyan Islands	Squamata
Megophrys ligayae	Palawan horned frog		Endemic to the Balabac and Palawan	Anura
Montipora setosa			Native to the eastern Indian Ocean and the western Pacific Ocean	Scleractinia
Neostethus thessa	Priapium fish		Endemic to Lake Mainit, Mindanao	Atheriniformes
Nyctimene rabori	Philippine tube-nosed fruit bat		Endemic to the Visayas	Chiroptera
Oligodon meyerinkii	Sulu short-headed snake		Endemic to the Sulu Archipelago	Squamata
Opisthotropis alcalai	Gary's mountain keelback		Endemic to the Mount Malindang, Zamboanga del Norte	Squamata
Ospatulus palaemophagus	Sulu short-headed snake		Endemic to Lake Lanao	Squamata
Papilio chikae	Luzon peacock swallowtail)		Endemic to the Philippines	Lepidoptera
Parantica milagros	Milagros' tiger		Endemic to the Philippines	Lepidoptera
Parantica schoenigi	Father Schoenig's chocolate		Endemic to the Philippines	Lepidoptera
Pectinia maxima	Pectinia coral		Native to Northern Australia and Southeast Asia	Scleractinia
Pelochelys cantorii	Frog-faced softshell turtle, Cantor's giant softshell		Native to South Asia and Southeast Asia	Testudines
Pelophryne albotaeniata	Palawan toadlet		Endemic to Palawan	Anura
Penelopides mindorensis	Mindoro hornbill	Talusi tirik, Tirik	Endemic to Mindoro	Coraciiformes
Penelopides panini	Visayan hornbill, tarictic hornbill, Ticao tarictic hornbill	Tariktik, Talusi, Taosi	Less than 1800 individuals remain. Endemic to Visayas. Subspecies on Ticao likely extinct.	Coraciiformes
Phapitreron cinereiceps	Tawitawi brown dove		Endemic to the Sulu Archipelago	Columbiformes
Philautus schmackeri	Mindoro tree frog		Endemic to Mindoro	Anura
Philautus surrufus			Endemic to Mindanao	Anura
Platymantis cagayanensis			Endemic to Luzon and Palaui Island	Anura
Platymantis hazelae	Hazel's forest frog		Endemic to Masbate and Negros Island	Anura
Platymantis lawtoni			Endemic to Romblon, Tablas Island, and the Sibuyan Islands	Anura
Platymantis levigatus			Endemic to Romblon, Tablas Island, and the Sibuyan Islands	Anura
Platymantis negrosensis	Negros forest frog		Endemic to Panay and Negros Island	Anura
Platymantis panayensis	Panay forest frog		Endemic to Panay	Anura
Platymantis polillensis	Polilo forest frog		Endemic to Polillo Island and the Aurora Province	Anura
Platymantis spelaeus			Endemic to limestone caves in Negros Island	Anura
Platymantis subterrestris	Mount Data forest frog		Endemic to the central Luzon highlands	Anura
Platymantis taylori			Endemic to the Sierra Madres of Luzon	Anura
Podogymnura aureospinula	Dinagat moonrat, Dinagat gymnure		Endemic to the Dinagat Islands	Erinaceomorpha
Porites eridani	Stony coral		Native to the eastern Indian Ocean and the western Pacific Ocean	Scleractinia
Porites ornata	Stony coral		Native to the eastern Indian Ocean and the western Pacific Ocean	Scleractinia
Pseudorabdion montanum	Mountain burrowing snake		Endemic to Negros Island	Squamata
Ramphotyphlops suluensis			Endemic to the Sulu Archipelago	Squamata
Rhinocypha hageni			Endemic to Jolo Island	Odonata
Rhinomyias albigularis	White-throated jungle-flycatcher		Endemic to western Visayas	Passeriformes
Risiocnemis antoniae			Endemic to Mindanao	Odonata
Rusa alfredi	Philippine spotted deer, Visayan spotted deer		Endemic to Panay and Negros Island, though formerly found throughout Visayas	Artiodactyla
Sphenomorphus biparietalis	Sulu sphenomorphus		Endemic to the Sulu Archipelago	Squamata
Sphyrna lewini	Scalloped hammerhead		Global	Carcharhiniformes
Sphyrna mokarran	Great hammerhead shark		Global	Carcharhiniformes
Stachyris nigrorum	Negros striped-babbler, Negros tree-babbler		Endemic to Negros Island	Passeriformes
Sulcosticta striata			Endemic to Luzon	Odonata
Sundathelphusa sottoae			Endemic to Bohol	Decapoda
Sus oliveri	Oliver's warty pig		Endemic to Mindoro	Artiodactyla
Tragulus nigricans	Philippine mouse-deer, Balabac mouse deer	Pilandok	Endemic to Balabac and nearby islands in southwest Palawan	Artiodactyla
Tringa guttifer	Spotted greenshank, Nordmann's greenshank		Native to Asia	Charadriiformes
Varanus mabitang	Panay monitor lizard	Mabitang	Endemic to Panay	Squamata

=== Critically endangered ===
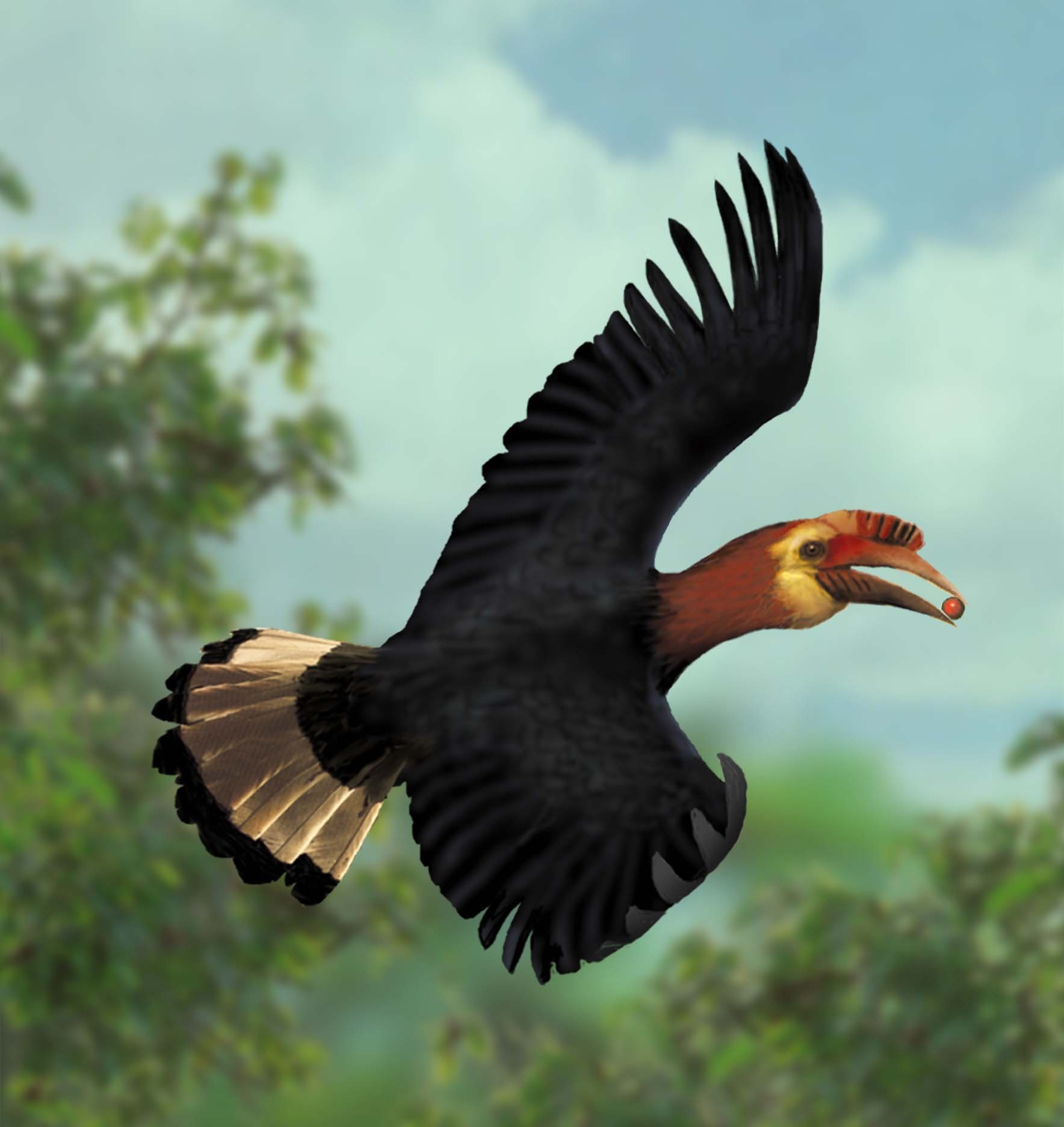
Rufous-headed hornbill (Aceros waldeni)

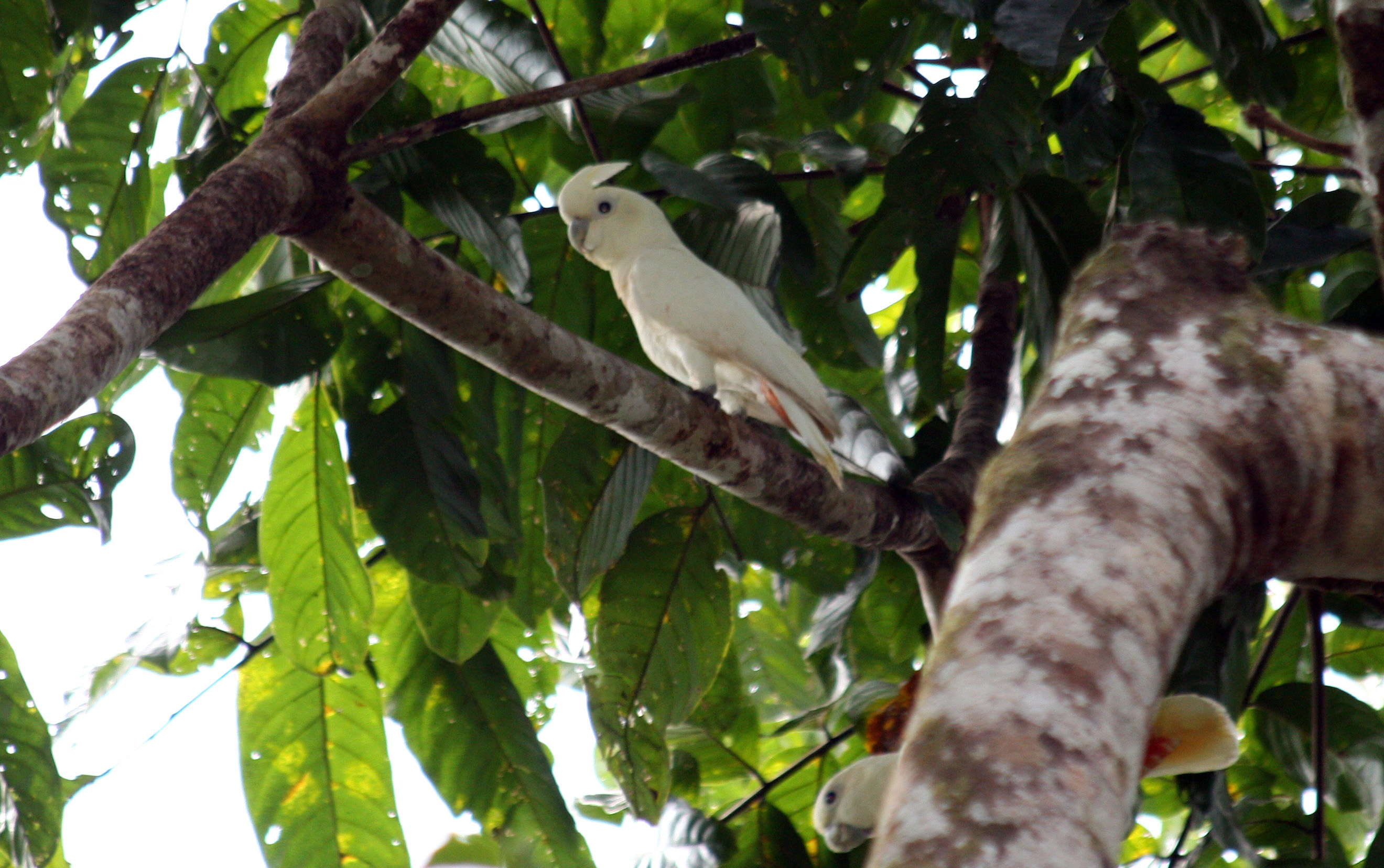
Red-vented cockatoo (Cacatua haematuropygia)

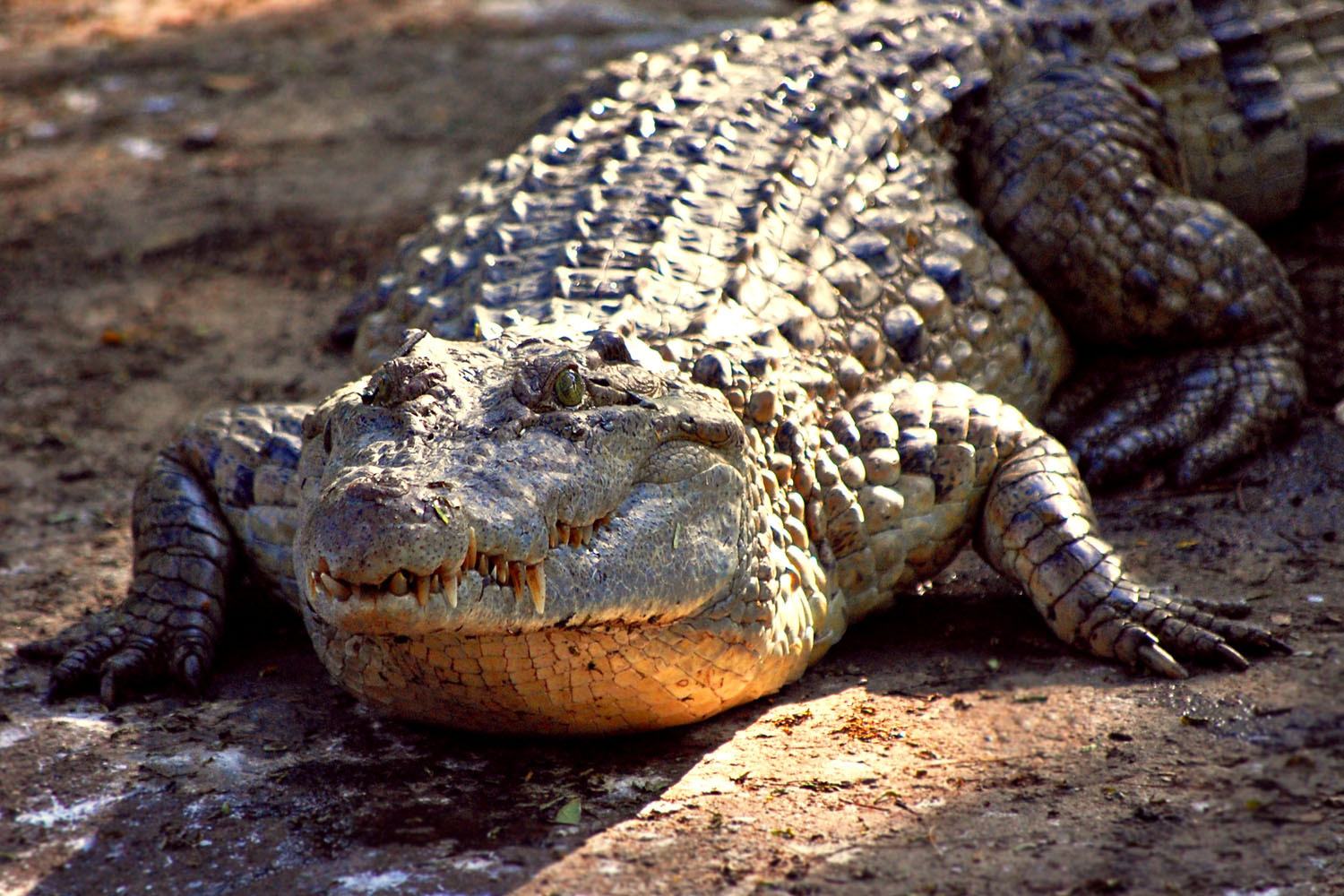
Philippine crocodile (Crocodylus mindorensis)

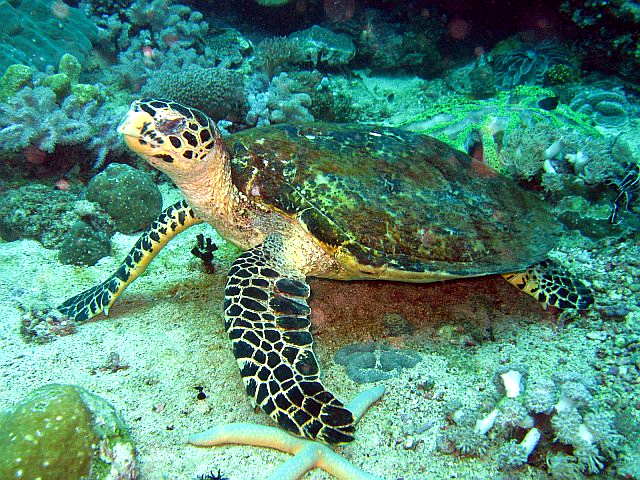
Hawksbill sea turtle (Eretmochelys imbricata)

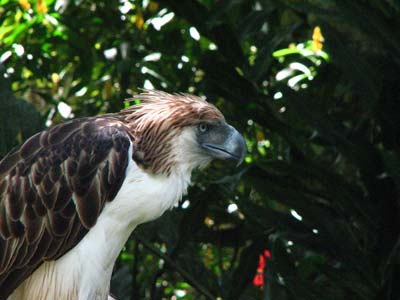
Philippine eagle (Pithecophaga jefferyi)

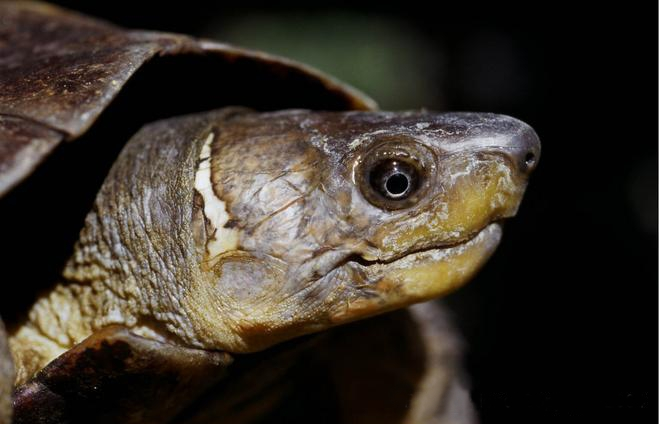
Philippine forest turtle (Siebenrockiella leytensis)

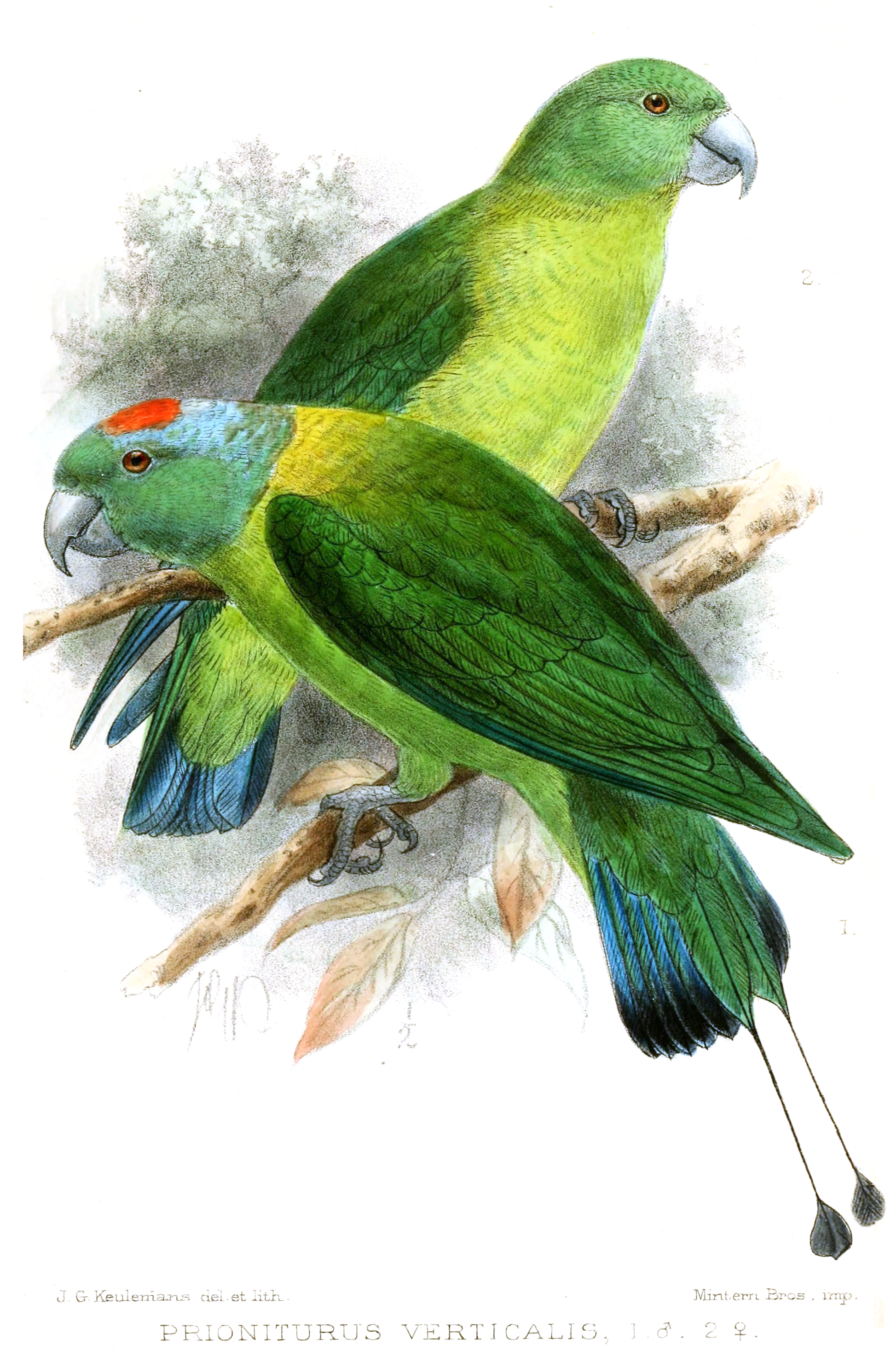
Blue-winged racquet-tail (Prioniturus verticalis)

Scientific name	Common name(s)	Local name(s)	Distribution
Aceros waldeni	Rufous-headed hornbill, Visayan wrinkled hornbill, Walden's hornbill, writhed-billed hornbill	Kalaw	Endemic to Panay, small concentrations on the southwestern end of the province of Zamboanga del Norte in Mindanao, may already be extinct on Negros, extinct on Guimaras
Anoxypristis cuspidata	Knifetooth sawfish, narrow sawfish, pointed sawfish		Native to the western Pacific and eastern Indian Ocean
Brachymeles cebuensis	Cebu small worm skink		Endemic to Cebu
Bubalus mindorensis	Tamaraw, Mindoro dwarf buffalo, Tamarou	Tamaraw	263 individuals in 2008. Being captive bred. Endemic to Mindoro
Cacatua haematuropygia	Red-vented cockatoo, Philippine cockatoo	Katala, Kalangay	Around 180 individuals left in the wild in Palawan. Being captive bred. Formerly widespread in the Philippines
Centropus steerii	Black-hooded coucal		Endemic to Mindoro
Cephalakompsus pachycheilus			Extinct. Was endemic to Lake Lanao
Crateromys australis	Dinagat bushy-tailed cloud rat, Dinagat Crateromys		Endemic to the Dinagat Islands, populations might also exist in Siargao and Bucas Grande
Crateromys paulus	Ilin Island cloudrunner		No sightings since 1953. Possibly extinct. Endemic to Ilin Island.
Crocodylus mindorensis	Philippine crocodile, Mindoro crocodile, Philippine freshwater crocodile		Less than 100 adults believed to survive in 1992. Endemic to the Philippines
Dobsonia chapmani	Philippine bare-backed fruit bat, Philippine naked-backed fruit bat		Rediscovered in 2000 after presumed extinct in the 1970s. Survives in very small numbers in Cebu and Negros Island
Eretmochelys imbricata	Hawksbill sea turtle	Pawikan	Global
Gallicolumba keayi	Negros bleeding-heart	Endemic to Panay and Negros Island	
Gallicolumba luzonica	Luzon bleeding heart	Kalapating gubat, punalada, kalapating dugong puso	Luzon Island, Polillo Island
Gallicolumba luzonica rubiventris	Catanduanes bleeding heart	Agbaan	Catanduanes Island, Possibly extinct
Gallicolumba menagei	Sulu bleeding-heart		Sighting reports in 1995. Endemic to the Sulu Archipelago
Gallicolumba platenae	Mindoro bleeding-heart	Kulo-kulo	Largest remaining population in Mount Siburan, Mindoro
Hampala lopezi			Endemic to the Philippines
Helicostyla smargadina			Endemic to the Philippines
Lycodon chrysoprateros	Ross' wolf snake		Endemic to Dalupiri Island, Cagayan Province. Possible specimens collected from Calayan and northern Camiguin de Babuyanes
Mandibularca resinus	Bagangan	Bagangan	Endemic to Lake Lanao
Orcaella brevirostris	Irrawaddy dolphin		Native to Southeast Asia and Northern Australia
Oriolus isabellae	Isabela oriole, Isabella oriole		Estimated at less than 250 individuals remaining. Endemic to Luzon
Ospatulus truncatus	Bitungu	Bitungu	Endemic to Lake Lanao
Pandaka pygmaea	Dwarf pygmy goby	Bia, Tabios	Possibly extinct in the Philippines after land reclamation projects in Malabon of the Tullahan River habitat. Populations reported in Indonesia and Singapore
Parantica davidi	David's tiger		Endemic to the Philippines
Phloeomys cumingi	Southern Luzon giant tailed cloud rat		Endemic to Catanduanes Island and Southern Luzon
Pithecophaga jefferyi	Philippine eagle	Haribon	180 to 500 birds are believed to survive. Currently being captive bred. Endemic to the Philippines
Platymantis insulatus			Endemic to the Gigantes Sur, Iloilo Province
Prioniturus verticalis	Blue-winged racquet-tail		Endemic to the Sulu Archipelago
Pristis microdon	Largetooth sawfish, freshwater sawfish, Leichhardt's sawfish, smalltooth sawfish		Endemic to the western Pacific and the Indian Ocean
Protosticta plicata			Endemic to Kawasan Falls in Cebu
Ptilinopus arcanus	Negros fruit dove		No sightings since 1953. Possibly extinct. Endemic to Negros Island
Puntius amarus	Pait	Pait	Endemic to Lake Lanao
Puntius baoulan	Baolan	Baolan	Endemic to Lake Lanao
Puntius clemensi	Bagangan	Bagangan	Endemic to Lake Lanao
Puntius disa	Disa	Disa	Endemic to Lake Lanao
Puntius flavifuscus	Katapa-tapa	Katapa-tapa	Endemic to Lake Lanao
Puntius herrei			Endemic to Lake Lanao
Puntius katalo	Katolo	Katolo	Endemic to Lake Lanao
Puntius lanaoensis	Kandar	Kandar	Endemic to Lake Lanao
Puntius manalak	Manalak	Manalak	Endemic to Lake Lanao
Puntius tras	Tras	Tras	Endemic to Lake Lanao
Risiocnemis seidenschwarzi	Palata	Palata	Endemic to Cebu
Siebenrockiella leytensis	Philippine forest turtle, Philippine pond turtle, Palawan turtle, Leyte pond turtle		Recently rediscovered. Endemic to Palawan
Spratellicypris palata	Palata	Palata	Endemic to Lake Lanao
Sus cebifrons	Visayan warty pig		One subspecies believed to be extinct. Surviving subspecies endemic to Panay and Negros Island. Being captive bred in the Netherlands and California

== Plants ==
The following is a list of plant species classified as threatened:

=== Vulnerable ===
Scientific name	Common name(s)	Local name(s)	Distribution
Aerides leeana			Endemic to Luzon and Samar
Agathis philippinensis	Almaciga, dayungon	Almaciga, dayungon	Endemic to the Philippines, Sulawesi and Halmahera
Aglaia aherniana			Endemic to the Philippines
Aglaia angustifolia			Native to the Philippines, Brunei Darussalam, Indonesia, and Malaysia
Aglaia costata			Endemic to the Philippines
Aglaia cumingiana			Native to the Philippines and northern Borneo
Aglaia pyriformis			Endemic to Luzon
Aglaia smithii			Endemic to Indonesia and the Philippines
Alangium longiflorum			Endemic to Indonesia, Malaysia, and the Philippines
Areca parens		Takobtob	Endemic to the Philippines
Adenanthera intermedia			Endemic to the Philippines
Antidesma subolivaceum			Endemic to Palawan
Aquilaria cumingiana			Endemic to East Kalimantan, the Moluccas and the Philippines
Aquilaria malaccensis	Agarwood, aloewood, eaglewood, lign-aloes		Native to South Asia and Southeast Asia
Ardisia squamulosa			Endemic to the Philippines
Areca ipot	Ipot palm		Endemic to southern Luzon
Areca whitfardii			Endemic to Luzon and Mindoro
Arthrophyllum pulgarense			Endemic to Palawan
Artocarpus blancoi			Endemic to the Philippines
Artocarpus rubrovenus			Endemic to the Philippines
Artocarpus treculianus			Endemic to the Philippines
Avicennia rumphiana			Native to Southeast Asia
Mangifera altissima		Pahutan/paho mango	Native to Southeast Asia

=== Endangered ===
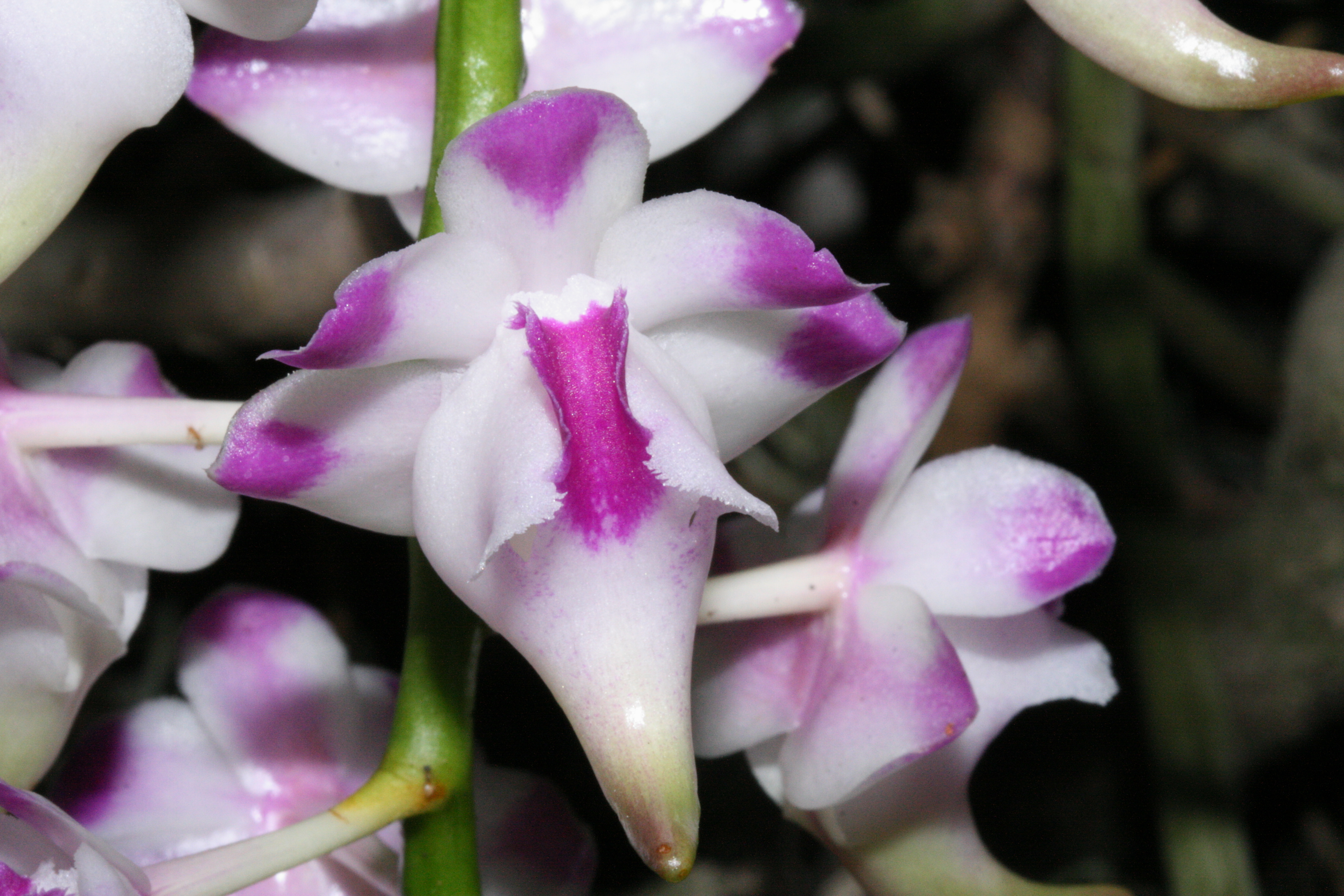
Aerides lawrenceae

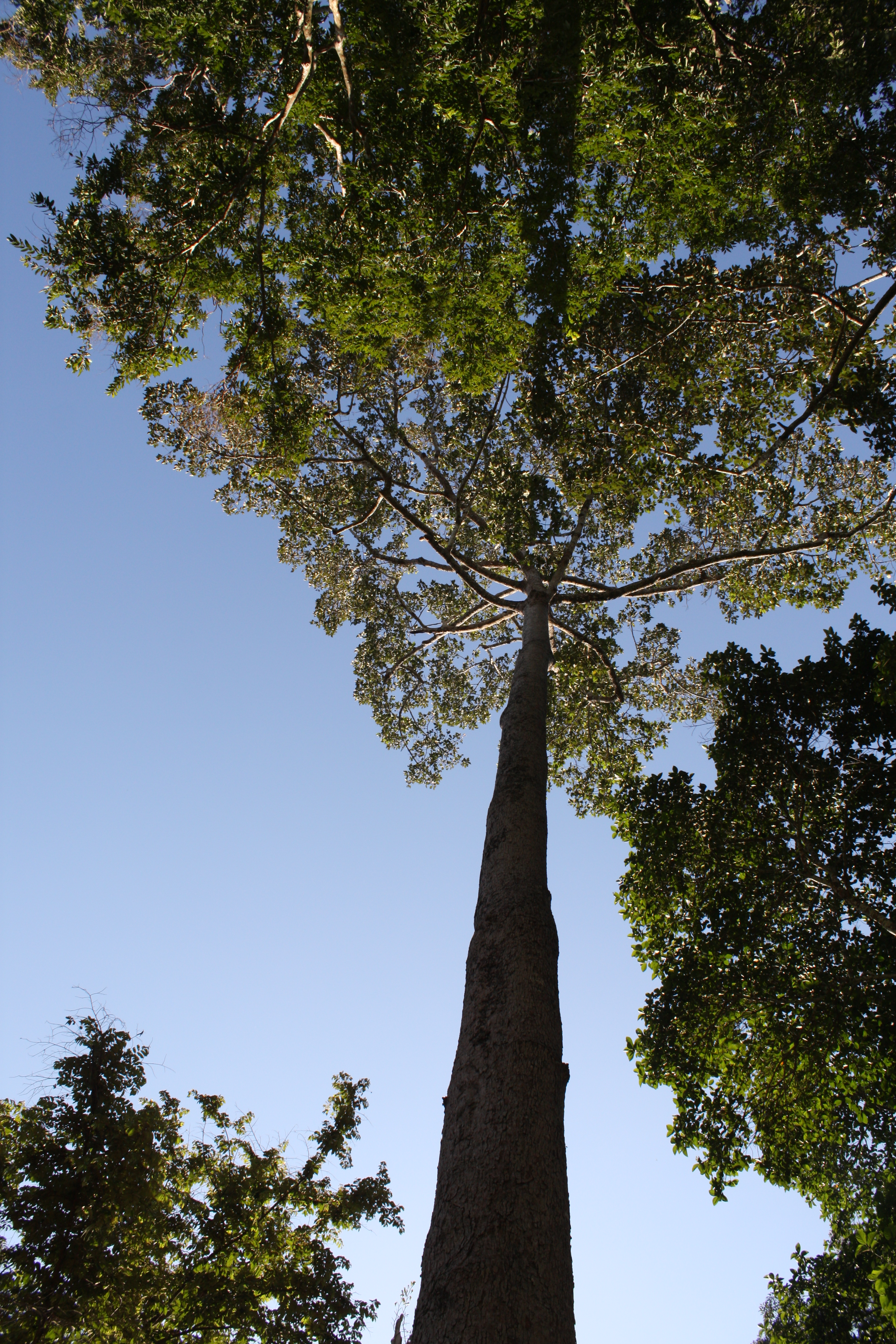
Dipterocarpus alatus

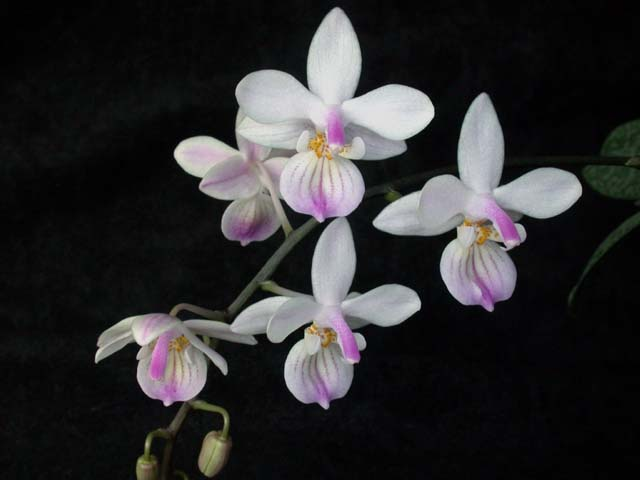
Phalaenopsis lindenii

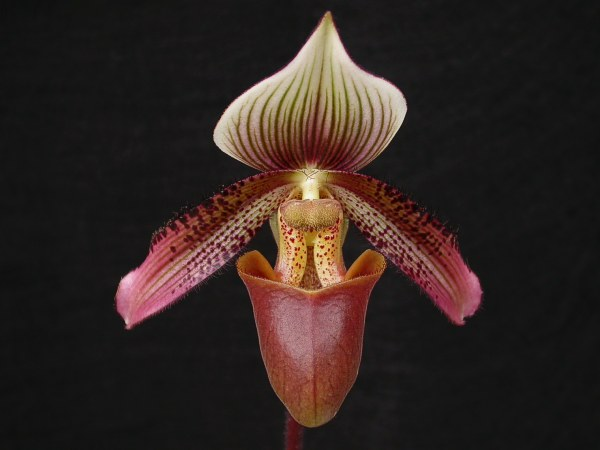
Paphiopedilum ciliolare

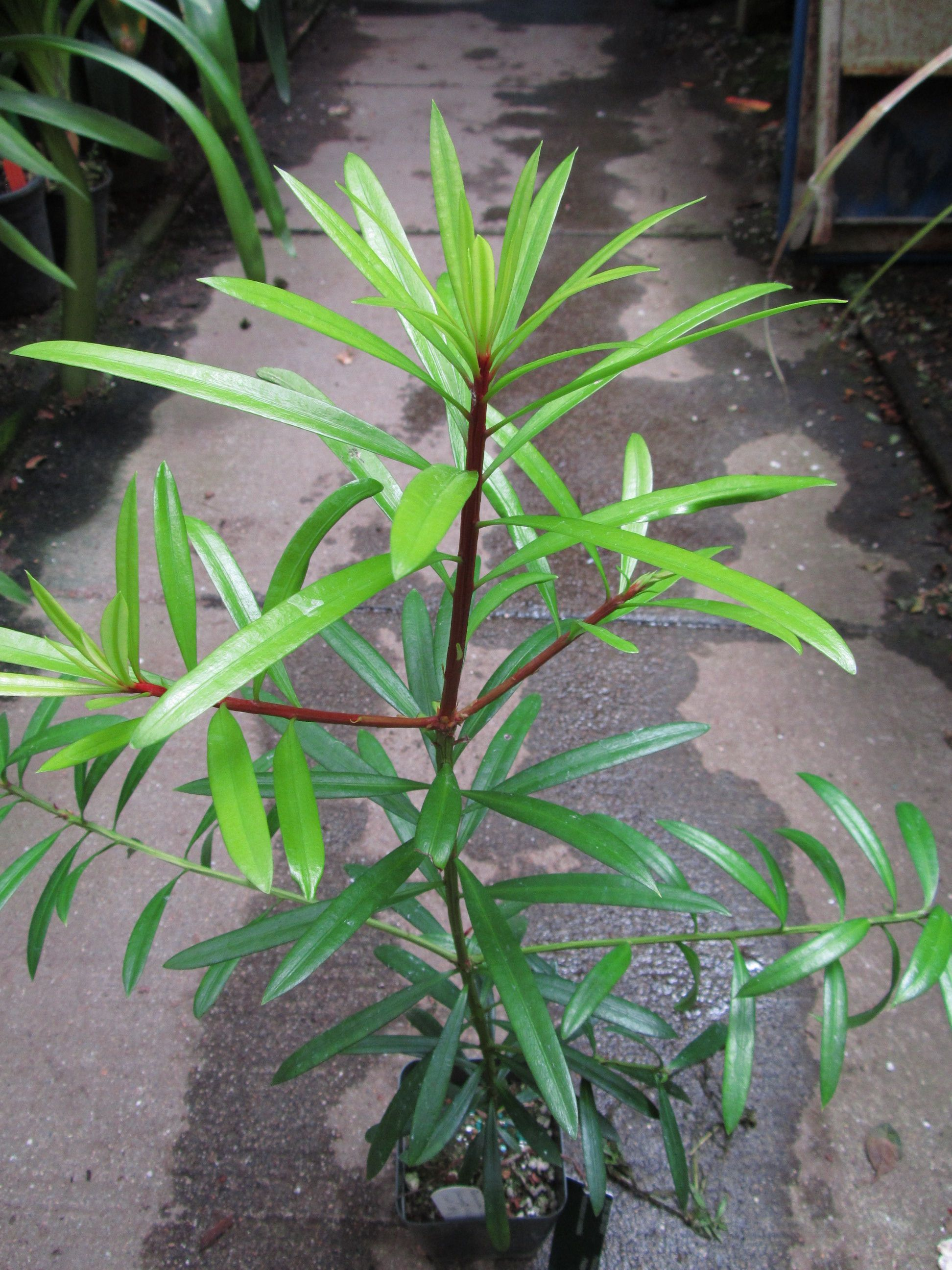
Podocarpus costalis

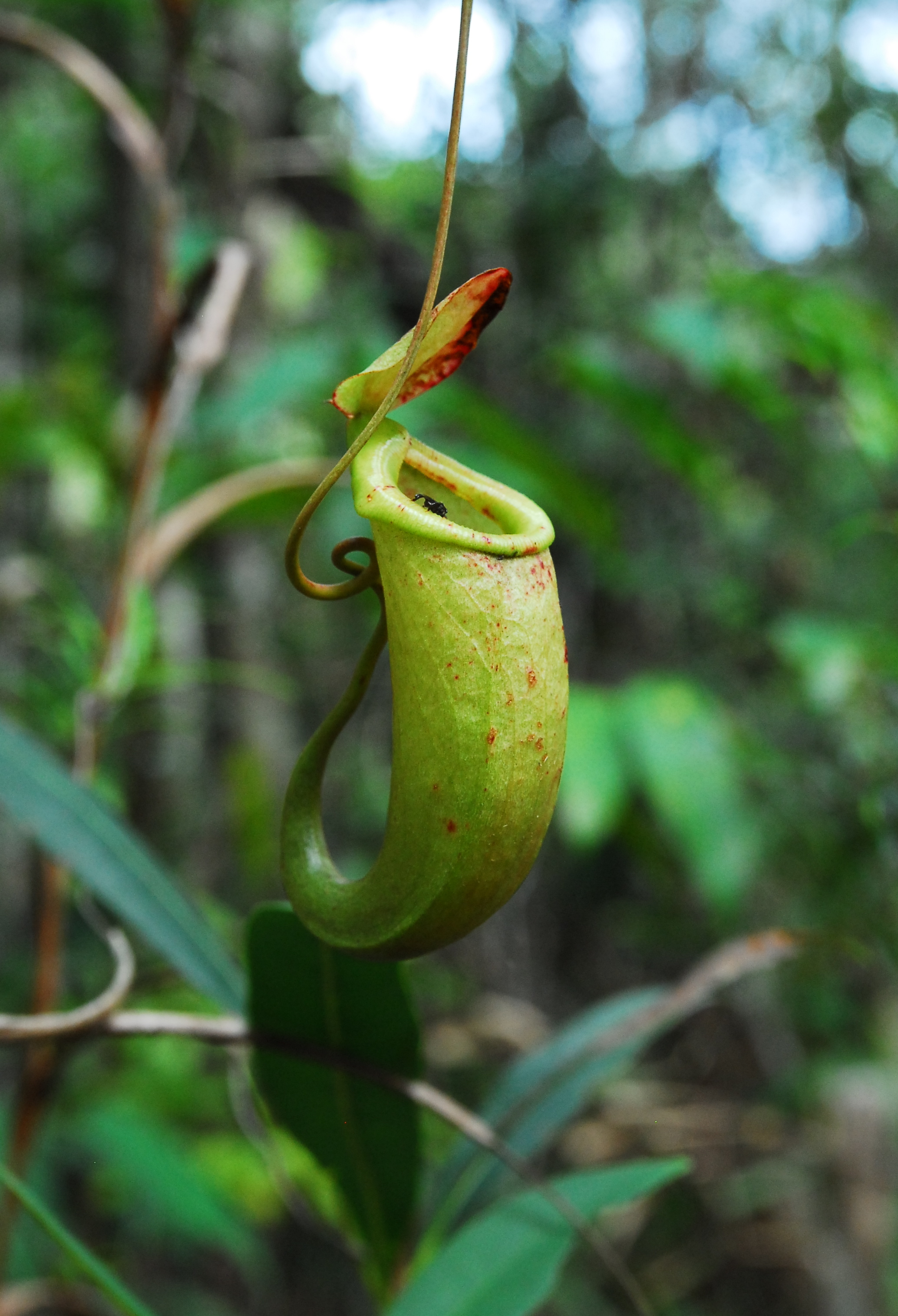
Nepenthes bellii

Scientific name	Common name(s)	Local name(s)	Distribution
Aerides lawrenceae			Endemic to Mindanao and Leyte
Amesiella philippinensis			Endemic to Luzon and Mindoro
Anisoptera costata			Native to Southeast Asia
Camptostemon philippinense			Native to Indonesia and the Philippines
Cryptocarya palawanensis			Endemic to Palawan
Cycas riuminiana	Chamberlain's cycad, Arayat pitogo	Pitogo	Endemic to Luzon
Diospyros philippinensis			Native to the Philippines, possibly present in Borneo
Dipterocarpus alatus			Native to Southeast Asia
Drepanolejeunea bakeri			Endemic to Luzon
Gloeocarpus patentivalvis			Endemic to Luzon, Mindanao, Samar, and Leyte
Guioa acuminata			Endemic to Luzon and the Polillo Islands
Guioa discolor		Malaalahan	Endemic to Luzon and Samar
Guioa myriadenia			Endemic to Luzon
Guioa truncata			Endemic to Mindanao
Heptapleurum albidobracteatum			Endemic to Cebu, Leyte, and Mindanao
Heptapleurum palawanense			Endemic to Palawan
Horsfieldia obscurineria			Endemic to Luzon
Kibatalia puberula			Endemic to Samar
Kibatalia stenopetala			Endemic to Luzon and Mindanao
Mangifera monandra			Endemic to Luzon, Samar, Leyte, Ticao and Guimaras.
Merrilliobryum fabronioides			Endemic to Luzon
Nepenthes bellii			Endemic to Dinagat and Mindanao
Nepenthes truncata			Endemic to Dinagat, Leyte, and Mindanao
Paphiopedilum ciliolare			Endemic to Luzon, Mindanao, Camiguin, and Dinagat Island
Phalaenopsis lindenii			Endemic to Luzon
Podocarpus costalis			Endemic to the Philippines and Taiwan
Prunus pulgarensis			Endemic to Palawan and Luzon
Prunus rubiginosa			Endemic to Luzon, Mindoro, Sibuyan and Mindanao
Rubroshorea ovata	Dark red meranti		Native to Indonesia, Malaysia, and the Philippines
Vanda javierae			Endemic to Calayan Island and Cagayan Province
Vanda scandens			Endemic to Mindanao and Palawan
Vatica mangachapoi			Native to Southeast Asia
Vatica maritima			Native to Indonesia, Malaysia, and the Philippines

=== Critically endangered ===
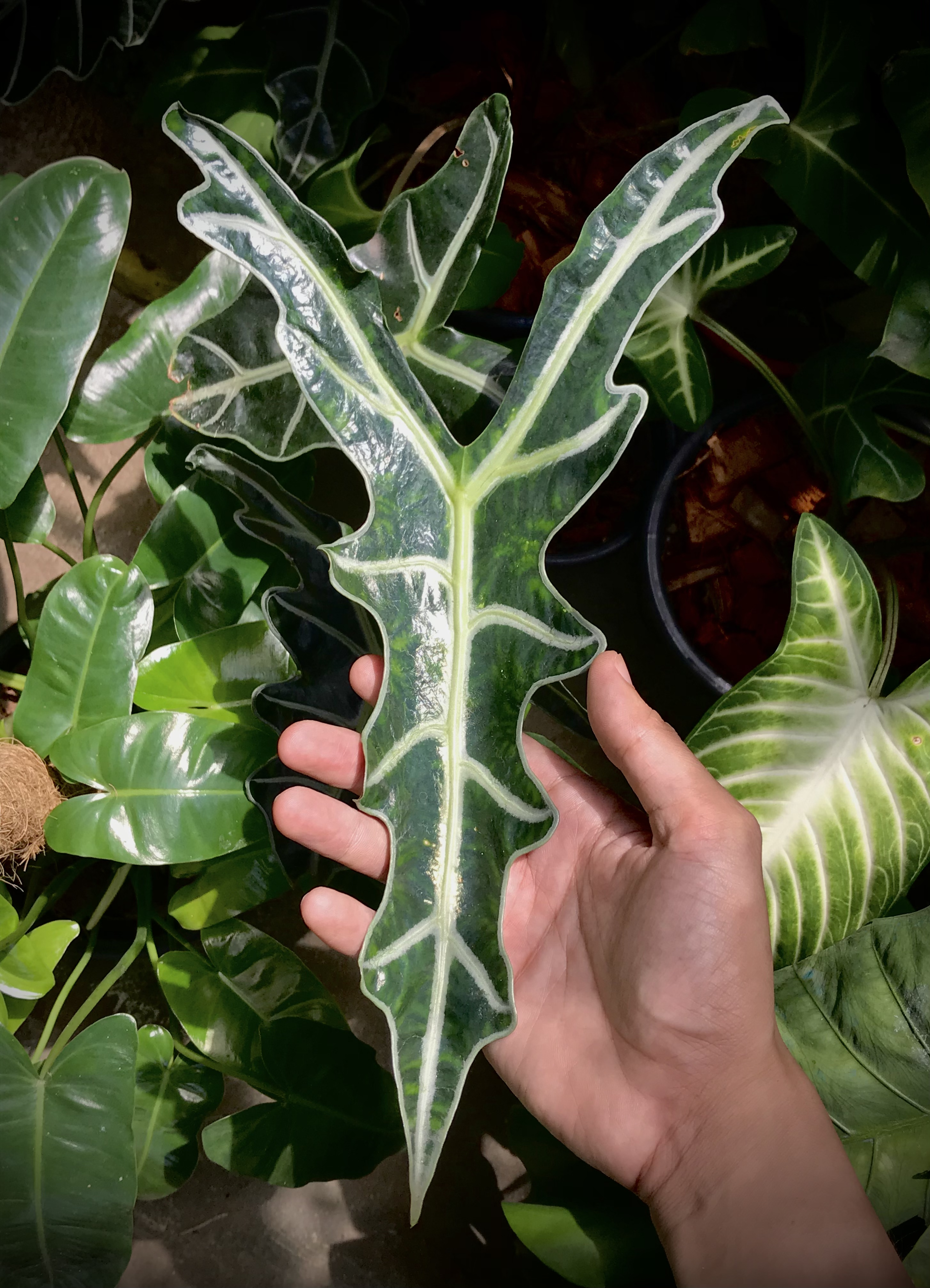
Alocasia sanderiana

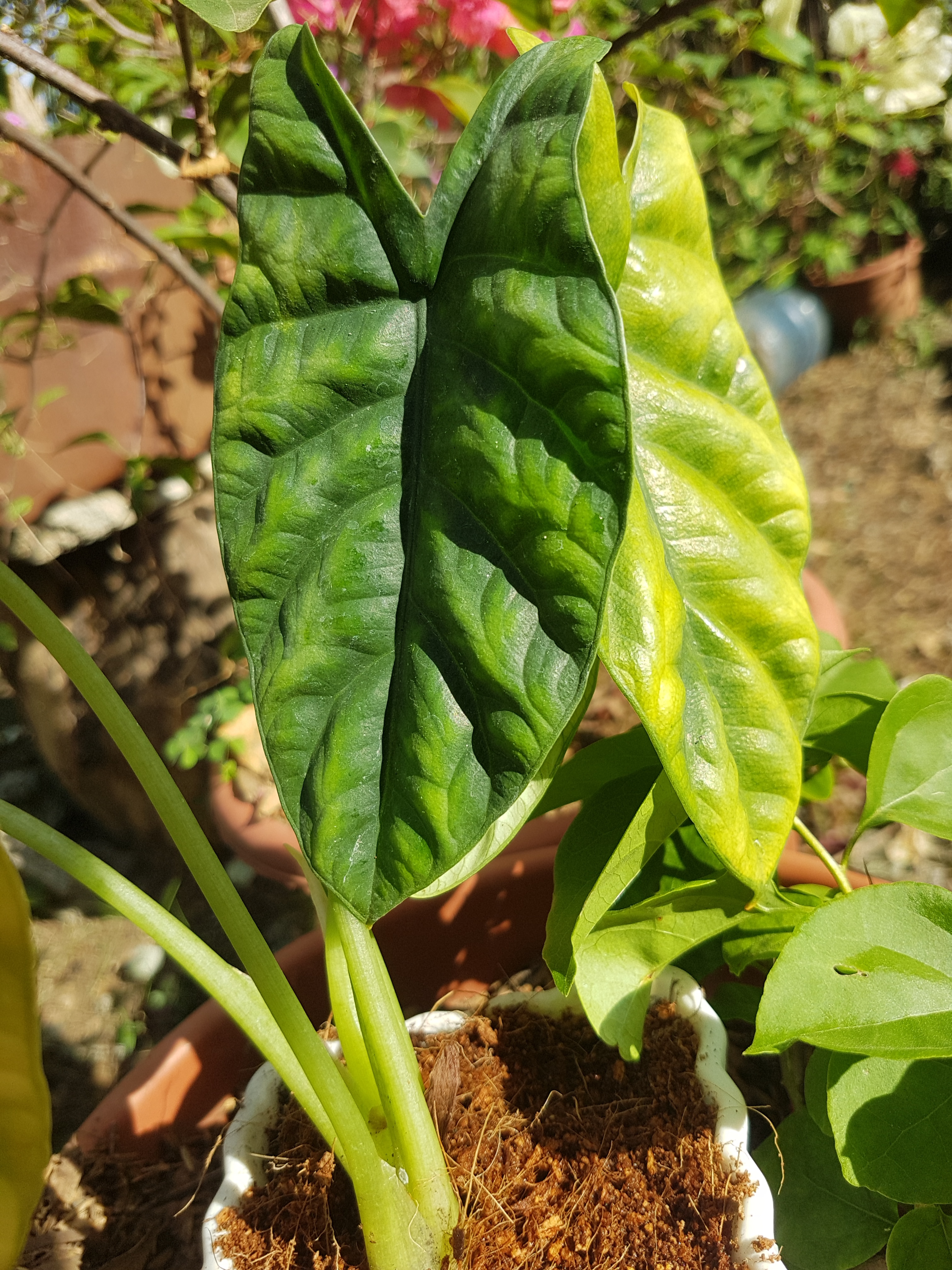
Alocasia sinuata

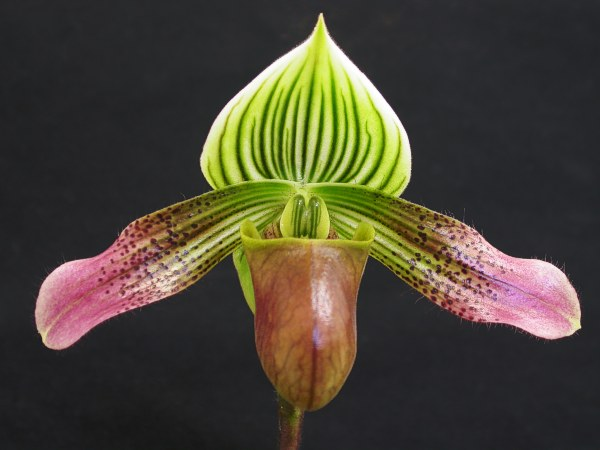
Paphiopedilum urbanianum

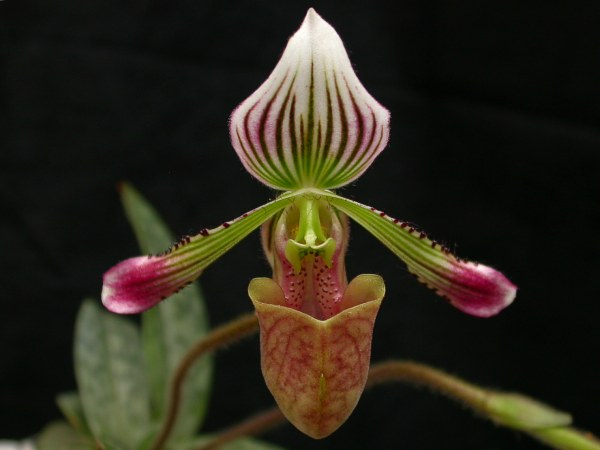
Paphiopedilum fowliei

Scientific name	Common name(s)	Local name(s)	Distribution
Alocasia atropurpurea			Endemic to Luzon highlands
Alocasia sanderiana	Sander's alocasia, kris plant		Endemic to Bukidnon, Catanduanes and Misamis Occidental, Philippines. Cultivated as an ornamental.
Alocasia sinuata			Endemic to Samar
Amesiella monticola			Endemic to Luzon
Ascoglossum calopterum			Endemic to Dinagat Island
Ceratocentron fesselii			Endemic to Nueva Ecija
Cryptocarya elliptifolia			Found to Lanyu Island in Taiwan, unknown status in the Philippines
Cycas curranii	Curran's pitogo		Endemic to Palawan and Mindoro
Cycas wadei	Wade's pitogo		Endemic to Culion Island
Cycas zambalensis			Endemic to Zambales
Dendrobium schuetzei			Endemic to Northeastern Mindanao
Dipterocarpus eurynchus			Native to Brunei Darussalam, Indonesia, Malaysia, and the Philippines
Dipterocarpus gracilis			Native to South Asia and Southeast Asia
Dipterocarpus grandiflorus		Apitong	Possibly extinct. New sightings in Catanduanes' Gigmoto Forest reserve has to be confirmed. Native to South Asia and Southeast Asia
Dipterocarpus hasseltii			Native to Southeast Asia
Dipterocarpus kerrii			Native to South Asia and Southeast Asia
Dipterocarpus validus			Native to Indonesia, Malaysia, and the Philippines
Gastrochilus calceolaris			Endemic to Benguet
Gongrospermum philippinense			Endemic to Luzon
Guioa palawanica			Endemic to Palawan
Guioa parvifoliola			Endemic to Ilocos Norte
Guioa reticulata			Endemic to Luzon. No reported collections since the 1960s–1970s
Heptapleurum agamae			Endemic to Palawan
Heptapleurum curranii			Endemic to Palawan
Hopea acuminata			Endemic to the Philippines
Hopea basilanica			Endemic to the Philippines
Hopea brachyptera			Endemic to the Mindanao
Hopea cagayanensis			Endemic to northeast Luzon
Hopea malibato		Dalingdingan	Endemic to the Philippines
Hopea mindanensis			Possibly already extinct. Endemic to the Philippines
Hopea philippinensis			Endemic to the Philippines
Hopea plagata		Saplungan, yakal saplungan	Native to Malaysia, and the Philippines
Hopea quisumbingiana			Endemic to the Samar
Hopea samarensis			Endemic to the Philippines
Kibatalia longifolia		Malapasnit	Endemic to Davao
Paphiopedilum adductum			Endemic to the Mindanao
Paphiopedilum fowliei			Endemic to the Palawan
Paphiopedilum urbanianum			Endemic to the Mindoro
Parashorea malaanonan	White lauan, white seraya	Apnit, bagtikan	Native to Brunei Darussalam, Malaysia, and the Philippines
Phalaenopsis micholitzii			Endemic to Camarines Sur and Zamboanga
Podocarpus palawanensis			Endemic to Pagdanan Range of Palawan
Rafflesia magnifica			Endemic to Mt. Candalaga, Davao de Oro of Mindanao
Shorea almon	Light red meranti, Philippine mahogany (U.S. timber trade), white lauan	Almon	Native to Malaysia, and the Philippines
Shorea astylosa		Yakal	Endemic to Catanduanes and other Philippine islands
Shorea contorta	White lauan		Endemic to the Philippines
Shorea falciferoides		Yakal yamban	Native to Indonesia and the Philippines
Shorea guiso	Hasselt's guijo, red balau		Native to Southeast Asia
Shorea hopeifolia	Yellow meranti		Native to Indonesia, Malaysia and the Philippines
Shorea malibato			Endemic to the Philippines
Shorea negrosensis	Red lauan		Endemic to the Philippines
Shorea palosapis	Philippine mahogany (U.S. timber trade), white lauan	Mayapis	Endemic to the Philippines
Shorea polysperma		Tangile	Endemic to the Philippines
Shorea seminis			Native to Malaysia, and the Philippines
Tectona philippinensis	Philippine teak		Endemic to Luzon and Iling Island
Vatica elliptica			Considered to be very close to extinction. Endemic to Mt. Kaladis, Zamboanga del Sur
Vatica pachyphylla			Endemic to eastern Luzon and Polillo Island

== See also ==
- National List of Threatened Terrestrial Fauna of the Philippines
- Katala Foundation
- Haribon Foundation
- List of endemic birds of the Philippines
- List of mammals of the Philippines
- Wild pigs of the Philippines

General:

- Wildlife of the Philippines
- Environmental issues in the Philippines
