= Cryptocarya elliptifolia =

- Isotype of Cryptocarya elliptifolia collected from Catanduanes, Philippines

Conservation status
- Critically Endangered (IUCN 3.1)

Scientific classification
- Kingdom: Plantae
- Clade: Tracheophytes
- Clade: Angiosperms
- Clade: Magnoliids
- Order: Laurales
- Family: Lauraceae
- Genus: Cryptocarya
- Species: C. elliptifolia

Binomial name
- Cryptocarya elliptifolia Merr.

Species of tree from the Philippines and Taiwan

Cryptocarya elliptifolia is a species of small evergreen tree in the family Lauraceae. It is native to the Philippines and Orchid Island in Taiwan. It is classified as Critically Endangered by the IUCN Red List of Threatened Species.

== Taxonomy ==
Cryptocarya elliptifolia was first described by the American botanist Elmer Drew Merrill in 1919. The type specimen was collected from forests along small streams in San Andres, Catanduanes (previously known as 'Calolbong'). The specific epithet is Latin for "elliptical leaves". It is a member of the genus Cryptocarya in the laurel family Lauraceae.

== Distribution ==
Cryptocarya elliptifolia is native to the Philippines and Orchid Island in Taiwan. Its populations are severely fragmented due to urbanization.

== Description ==
Cryptocarya elliptifolia is a small tree, growing only to around 6 m (20 ft) tall. The leaves are large, around 15 to 20 cm (5.9 to 7.9 in) long and 7 to 9 cm (2.8 to 3.5 in), ovate to elliptic in shape (hence the name), and tapering to a sharp point (acuminate). They are olive green in color and very smooth. The bark is also smooth and brown to olive green in color. The flowers and fruits are borne on panicles around 7 cm (2.8 in) long. The fruits, which are around 1.5 cm (0.59 in) in diameter, are round, black when dry, faintly ridged lengthwise and smooth.

== See also ==
- List of threatened species of the Philippines
