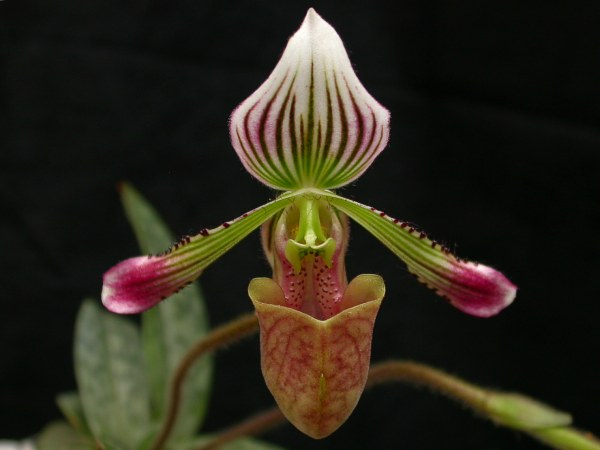

Conservation status
- Critically Endangered (IUCN 3.1)

Scientific classification
- Kingdom: Plantae
- Clade: Tracheophytes
- Clade: Angiosperms
- Clade: Monocots
- Order: Asparagales
- Family: Orchidaceae
- Subfamily: Cypripedioideae
- Genus: Paphiopedilum
- Species: P. fowliei

Binomial name
- Paphiopedilum fowliei Birk

Synonyms
- Paphiopedilum hennisianum var. fowliei (Birk) P.J.Cribb; Paphiopedilum fowliei var. sangianum Braem; Paphiopedilum fowliei f. christianae Braem; Paphiopedilum fowliei f. sangianum (Braem) O.Gruss & Roeth

= Paphiopedilum fowliei =

Species of orchid

Paphiopedilum fowliei is a species of plant in the family Orchidaceae. It is endemic to Palawan in the Philippines. Its natural habitat is subtropical or tropical moist lowland forests. It is threatened by habitat loss.

== Etymology ==
This orchid was named after Dr. Jack Fowlie, who was an editor of Orchid Digest. Interestingly, this is not the only species named after Fowlie: the Paphiopedilum jackii was also named after him.

== Description ==
The orchid is herbaceous with blue-gray leaves that are tessellated with faint patterns. The plant can attain a height of 20 centimeters, and leaves are from 10 to 14 centimeters long and 2.5 to 3.5 centimeters wide. Upper surfaces of leaves have patterns reminiscent of a fuzzy chessboard, while the bottom surfaces are uniformly light green. During bloom, an approximately 25 cm long inflorescence with a single flower emerges. Petals with veins of green and purple have black warts covering their edges and they curved in an s-shape.

While the plant has been reported to flower at various times throughout the year, it generally flowers between January and April. The length of each generation is about 7 or 8 years.

== Distribution and habitat ==
Paphiopedilum fowliei is found in the Philippine Islands in the forests of the southeast side of Palawan Island. This is the only known location of this plant.

The plant often grows on leaf mould or detritus on limestone rocks. While it often grows in bright light, the plant does not usually grow in direct sunlight, but will grow well under fluorescent lights. It usually grows at an elevation from 600 to 950 meters, and has a mean temperature range of 23 to 24 degrees Celsius. The plant prefers high humidity with sufficient air circulation.

== Conservation ==
Paphiopedilum fowliei is identified as critically endangered and only exists in one location. The entirety of the island on which it resides, Palawan island, is a declared protected area.
