= Vatica elliptica =

Conservation status
- Critically Endangered (IUCN 3.1)

Scientific classification
- Kingdom: Plantae
- Clade: Tracheophytes
- Clade: Angiosperms
- Clade: Eudicots
- Clade: Rosids
- Order: Malvales
- Family: Dipterocarpaceae
- Genus: Vatica
- Species: V. elliptica

Binomial name
- Vatica elliptica Foxw.

Species of tree

Vatica elliptica is a rare species of tree in the family Dipterocarpaceae, native to Mindanao island in the Philippines.

== Distribution ==
The tropical rain forest tree is endemic to Mount Kaladis in Zamboanga del Sur province, on the Zamboanga Peninsula of Mindanao island, in the southern Philippines. It is part of the Mindanao montane rain forests ecoregion flora.

It is an IUCN Red List Critically endangered species. Threatened by habitat loss, it is considered to be very close to extinction.

== See also ==
- List of threatened species of the Philippines
