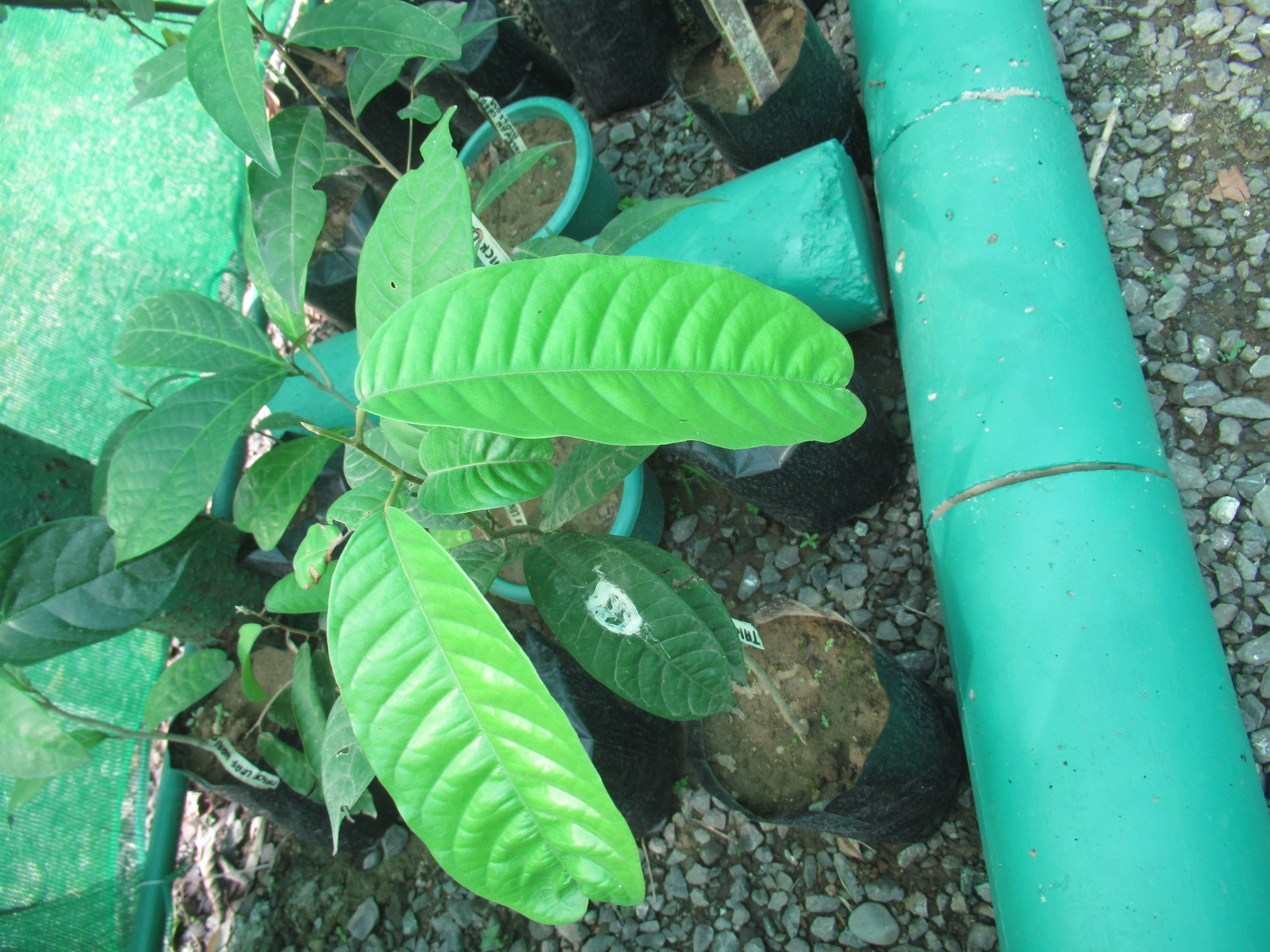

Conservation status
- Endangered (IUCN 3.1)

Scientific classification
- Kingdom: Plantae
- Clade: Tracheophytes
- Clade: Angiosperms
- Clade: Eudicots
- Clade: Rosids
- Order: Malvales
- Family: Dipterocarpaceae
- Genus: Vatica
- Species: V. pachyphylla

Binomial name
- Vatica pachyphylla Merr.

= Vatica pachyphylla =

Species of plant

Vatica pachyphylla is a species of flowering plant in the family Dipterocarpaceae.

== Distribution ==
Vatica pachyphylla is endemic to the Philippines, where it is confined to eastern Luzon and Polillo Island.

It is a tropical tree species found in the Luzon rain forests ecoregion. It is restricted to very low-altitude evergreen dipterocarp forest habitats of the ecoregion.

It is an endangered species threatened by habitat loss.

== See also ==
- List of threatened species of the Philippines
