= Dasia griffini =

Conservation status
- Vulnerable (IUCN 3.1)

Scientific classification
- Kingdom: Animalia
- Phylum: Chordata
- Class: Reptilia
- Order: Squamata
- Family: Scincidae
- Genus: Dasia
- Species: D. griffini

Binomial name
- Dasia griffini Taylor, 1915
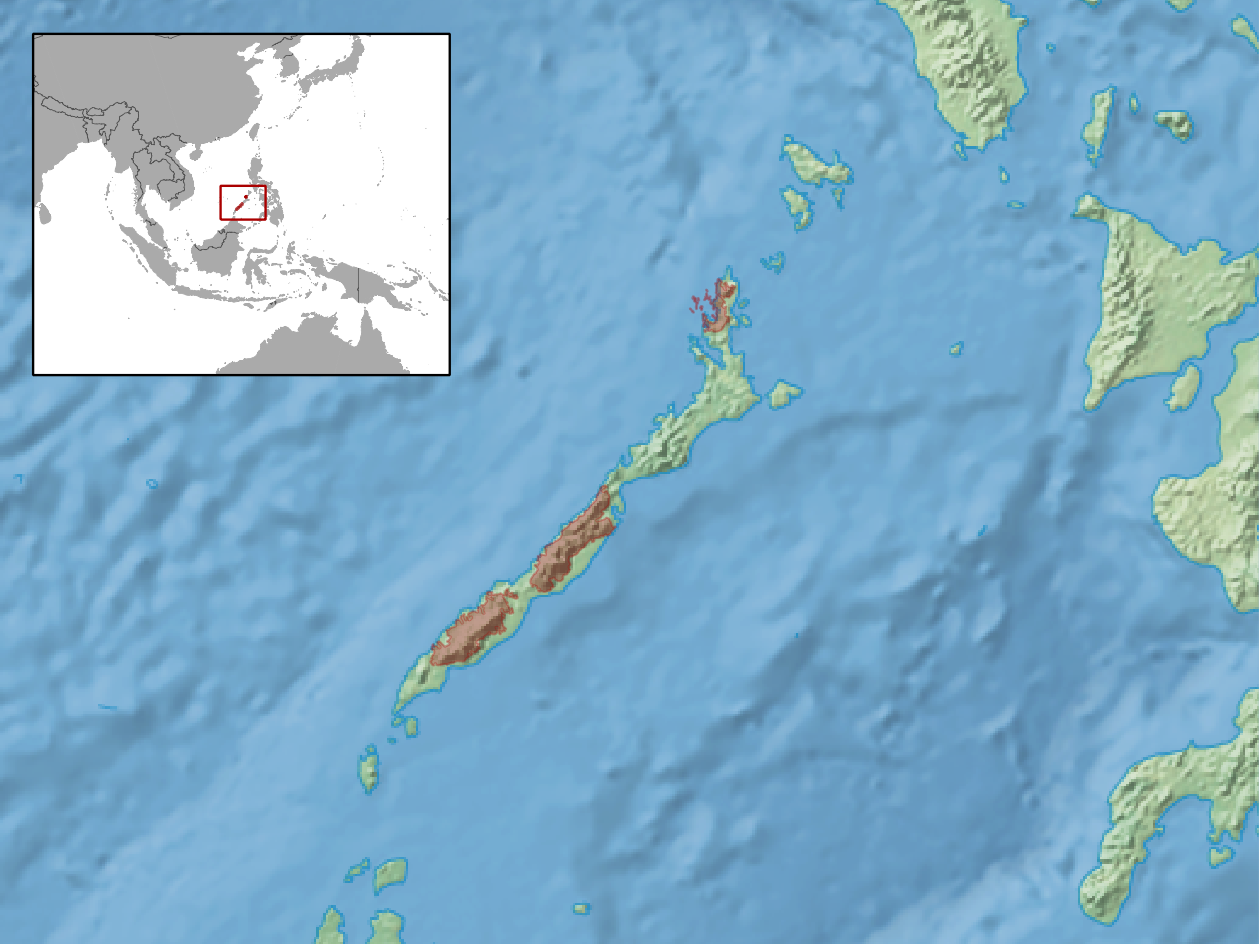

Species of lizard

Dasia griffini, commonly known as Griffin's keel-scaled tree skink or Griffin's dasia, is a species of tree skink, a lizard in the family Scincidae. The species is endemic to central and northern Palawan and southern Mindoro in the Philippines.

== Etymology ==
The specific name, griffini, is in honor of American herpetologist Lawrence Edmonds Griffin (1874–1949).

== Description ==
Griffin's keel-scaled tree skink may attain a snout-to-vent length (SVL) of 11 cm (4.3 in).

== Behavior and habitat ==
D. griffini is an arboreal lizard. It is found on tree trunks or aerial ferns 7 to 28 metres (23 to 92 ft) above the ground. It inhabits dipterocarp primary forests, at altitudes of 50–150 m (160–490 ft). More rarely, it is also found in coastal forests and scrubland.

== Reproduction ==
Griffin's dasia is oviparous.

== Taxonomy ==
D. griffini belongs to the genus Dasia. It is classified in the subfamily Mabuyinae of the skink family Scincidae.

== Conservation status ==
D. griffini is threatened by logging activities in its habitats.

== See also ==
- List of threatened species of the Philippines
