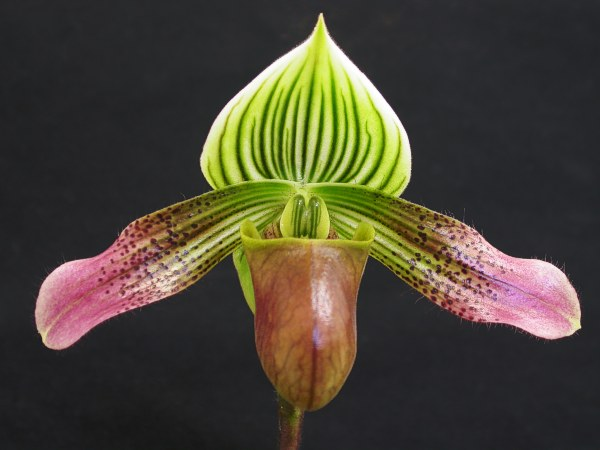

Conservation status
- Critically Endangered (IUCN 3.1)

Scientific classification
- Kingdom: Plantae
- Clade: Tracheophytes
- Clade: Angiosperms
- Clade: Monocots
- Order: Asparagales
- Family: Orchidaceae
- Subfamily: Cypripedioideae
- Genus: Paphiopedilum
- Species: P. urbanianum

Binomial name
- Paphiopedilum urbanianum Fowlie

Synonyms
- Paphiopedilum urbanianum f. alboviride Braem

= Paphiopedilum urbanianum =

Species of orchid

Paphiopedilum urbanianum is a species of plant in the family Orchidaceae. It is endemic to Mindoro in the Philippines. Its natural habitat is subtropical or tropical moist lowland forests. It is almost extinct in the wild, partly due to habitat loss, but even more so because of unsustainable collecting for the horticultural trade.
