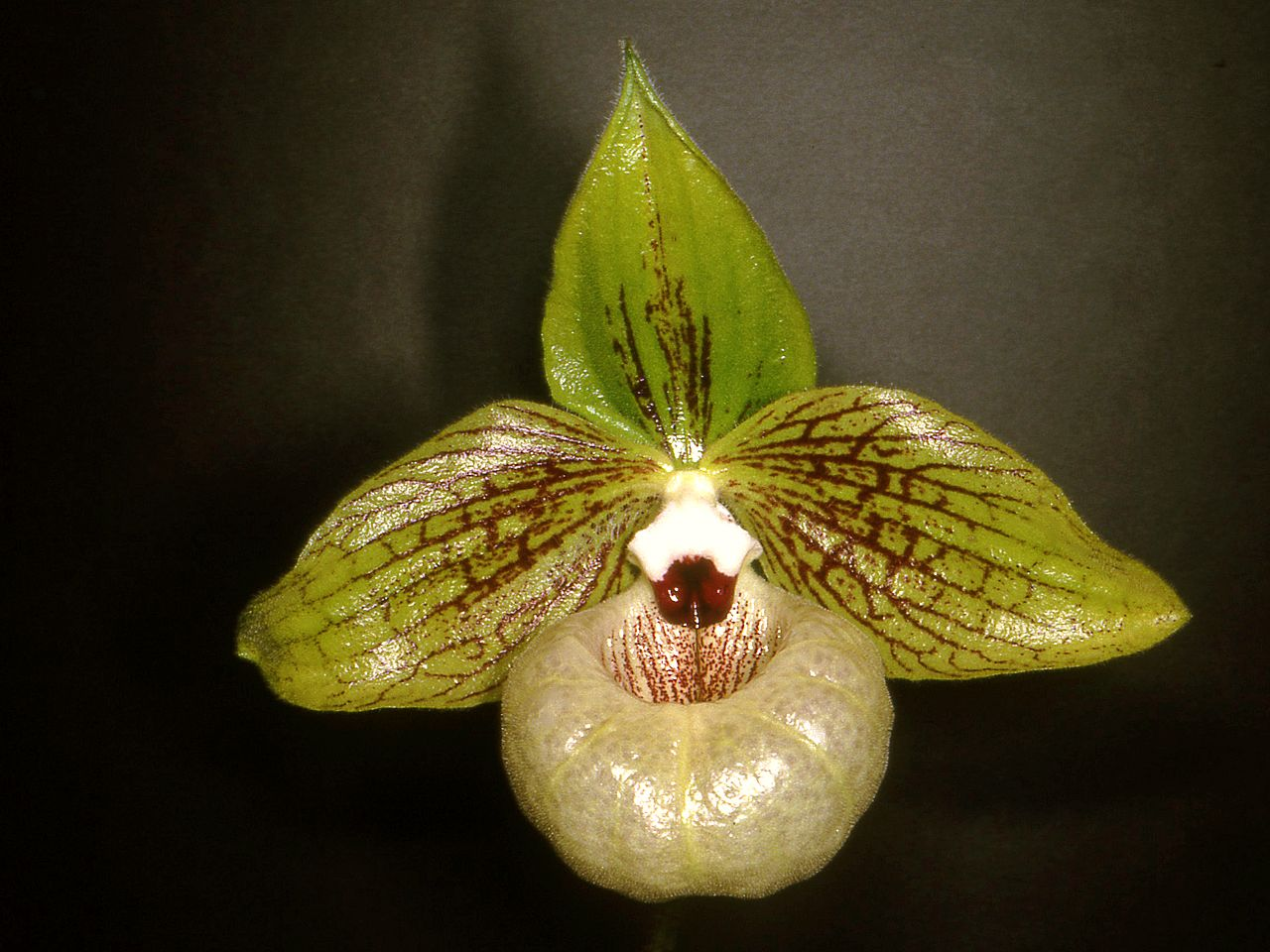

Conservation status
- Endangered (IUCN 3.1)
- CITES Appendix I

Scientific classification
- Kingdom: Plantae
- Clade: Tracheophytes
- Clade: Angiosperms
- Clade: Monocots
- Order: Asparagales
- Family: Orchidaceae
- Subfamily: Cypripedioideae
- Genus: Paphiopedilum
- Species: P. malipoense

Binomial name
- Paphiopedilum malipoense S.C.Chen & Z.H.Tsi 1984

Synonyms
- Paphiopedilum jackii

= Paphiopedilum malipoense =

Jade slipper orchid

Species of orchid

Paphiopedilum malipoense is a species of orchid commonly known as the jade slipper orchid. This hemicryptophyte plant starts blooming in the spring time and has one flower per inflorescence. The plant grows in intermediate to cool conditions. Its flowers have a raspberry fragrance.

== Distribution ==
Paphiopedilum malipoense is found in northern Vietnam and southern China at the elevation of 570 to 1600 meters. It is found growing on limestone cliffs with leaf litter. The area where this plant is found is subjected to heavy fog in the winter and rain in the early spring and summer.

== Culture ==
Keep in intermediate to cool areas, with temperatures around 35 °F (2 °C) to 80 °F (27 °C). To induce blooming, water less and keep cool during the winter. High amounts of light will cause the plant to flower more frequently. This plant does best in wet areas but moss near the roots would lower the pH to much sins it lives on lime rocks in the wild. Plants can be potted in a mix that contains gravel, bark and perlite. Keep humidity at 60 to 80%. Plants should be kept in areas with moderate lighting.

== Varieties and forms ==
- Paphiopedilum malipoense var. alba. Light green flower.
- Paphiopedilum malipoense var. angustatum, found in Yunnan (China)
- Paphiopedilum malipoense var. aureum
- Paphiopedilum malipoense f./var. concolor, found in Yunnan (China)
- Paphiopedilum malipoense var. hiepii
- Paphiopedilum malipoense var. jackii (H.S.Hua) Aver., found in southeastern Yunnan (China) to northern Vietnam. Formerly P. jackii.
- Paphiopedilum malipoense var. malipoense, found from southeastern Yunnan, southwestern Guizhou and southwestern Guangxi (China) to northern Vietnam. Includes f. tonnianum and f. virescens.
