= Aerides lawrenceae =

- Aerides lawrenceae

Conservation status
- Endangered (IUCN 3.1)

Scientific classification
- Kingdom: Plantae
- Clade: Embryophytes
- Clade: Tracheophytes
- Clade: Spermatophytes
- Clade: Angiosperms
- Clade: Monocots
- Order: Asparagales
- Family: Orchidaceae
- Subfamily: Epidendroideae
- Genus: Aerides
- Species: A. lawrenceae

Binomial name
- Aerides lawrenceae Rchb.f.

Species of orchid

Aerides lawrenceae is a species of plant in the family Orchidaceae. It is endemic to the Philippines. Its natural habitat is subtropical or tropical moist lowland forests. It is threatened by habitat loss and overcollection.

== Description ==
Growing in brightly lit environments at low elevations on the islands of Mindanao and Cebu, Aerides lawrenciae is a robust species up to 5 ft (1.5 meters) tall. It sometimes becomes pendulous. The inflorescence has up to 30 strongly fragrant flowers, each about 4 cm across. Flowering occurs during autumn.
