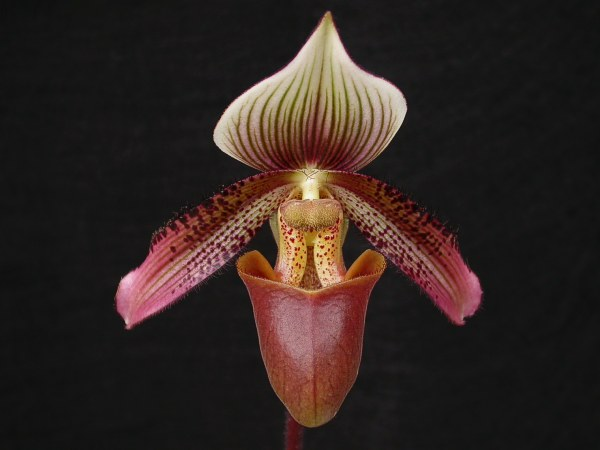

Conservation status
- Endangered (IUCN 3.1)

Scientific classification
- Kingdom: Plantae
- Clade: Tracheophytes
- Clade: Angiosperms
- Clade: Monocots
- Order: Asparagales
- Family: Orchidaceae
- Subfamily: Cypripedioideae
- Genus: Paphiopedilum
- Species: P. ciliolare

Binomial name
- Paphiopedilum ciliolare (Rchb.f.) Stein

Synonyms
- Cypripedium ciliolare Rchb.f. (basionym); Cypripedium miteauanum L.Linden & Rodigas; Cypripedium ciliolare var. miteauanum Linden; Paphiopedilum ciliolare var. miteauanum (Linden) Pfitzer; Cordula ciliolaris (Rchb.f.) Rolfe; Paphiopedilum superbiens ssp. ciliolare (Rchb.f.) M.W.Wood

= Paphiopedilum ciliolare =

Species of orchid

Paphiopedilum ciliolare or the short haired paphiopedilum is a species of slipper orchid endemic to northern Mindanao in the Philippines.

== Taxonomy ==
P. ciliolare was originally described by Reichenbach in 1882 as Cypripedium ciliolare, with its epithet derived from Latin cilium ("eyelid"), referring to the marginal hairs on its petals and sepals. Together with numerous then Cypripedium species, it was then reclassified into Paphiopedilum by Stein in 1892.

== Description ==
P. ciliolare consists of 4 to 6 leaves with dimensions of 10–16 centimetres (3.9–6.3 in) of length and 2–5 centimetres (0.79–1.97 in) of width, with the upper surface being dark and pale green, while the underside has a slight basal purple suffusion, and ciliate basal margins. Its purple, shortly pubescent inflorescence measures at 20–35 centimetres (7.9–13.8 in), and consists of a single flower that blooms to 7–9 centimetres (2.8–3.5 in) wide.

== Distribution ==
The slipper orchid is endemic to the northern tip of Mindanao in the Philippines, including Dinagat Islands and Camiguin, where it grows on base of shrubs in elevations of 300–1,800 metres (980–5,910 ft) and a mean temperature of 20–22 °C (68–72 °F).

== Conservation ==
P. ciliolare is a rare orchid with a total wild population of fewer than 2500 mature individuals, and it is endangered due to over-collection for horticulture trade, and its forest habitat is threatened with destruction and degradation.

== Cultivation ==
This species is known to be difficult to propagate, although it is easier to be done in a temperate climate. Nevertheless, various hybrids are successfully cultivated. Germination media are most effective when they contain sugar and tryptone.
