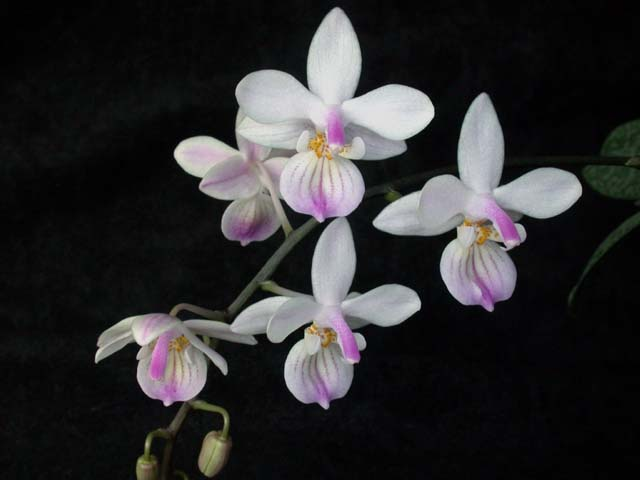

Conservation status
- Endangered (IUCN 3.1)

Scientific classification
- Kingdom: Plantae
- Clade: Tracheophytes
- Clade: Angiosperms
- Clade: Monocots
- Order: Asparagales
- Family: Orchidaceae
- Subfamily: Epidendroideae
- Genus: Phalaenopsis
- Species: P. lindenii

Binomial name
- Phalaenopsis lindenii Loher

= Phalaenopsis lindenii =

Species of orchid

Phalaenopsis lindenii is a species of plant in the family Orchidaceae, named after Belgian botanist Jean Jules Linden. It is endemic to the island of Luzon in the Philippines. Its natural habitat is subtropical or tropical moist lowland forests. It is threatened by habitat loss.
