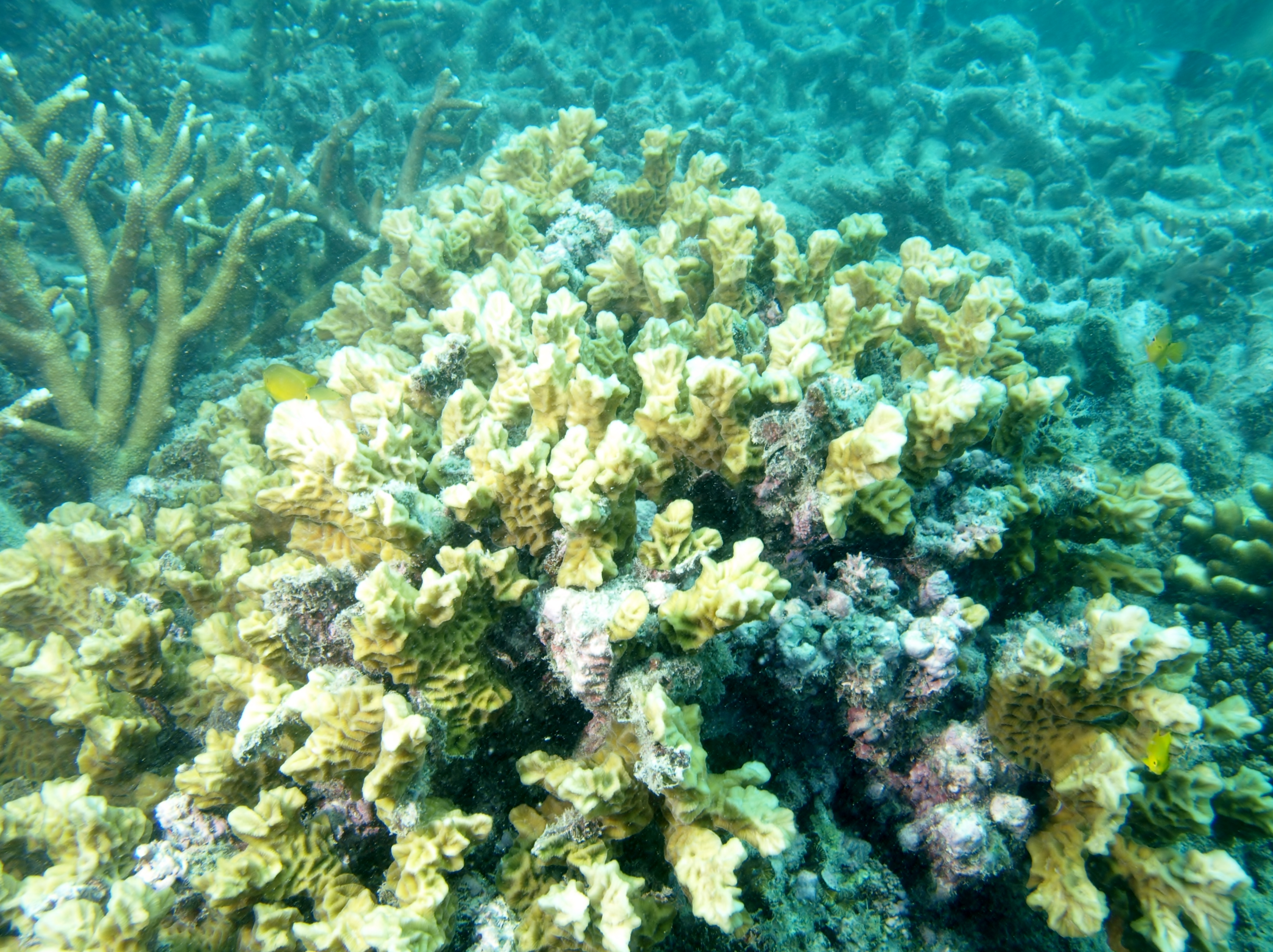

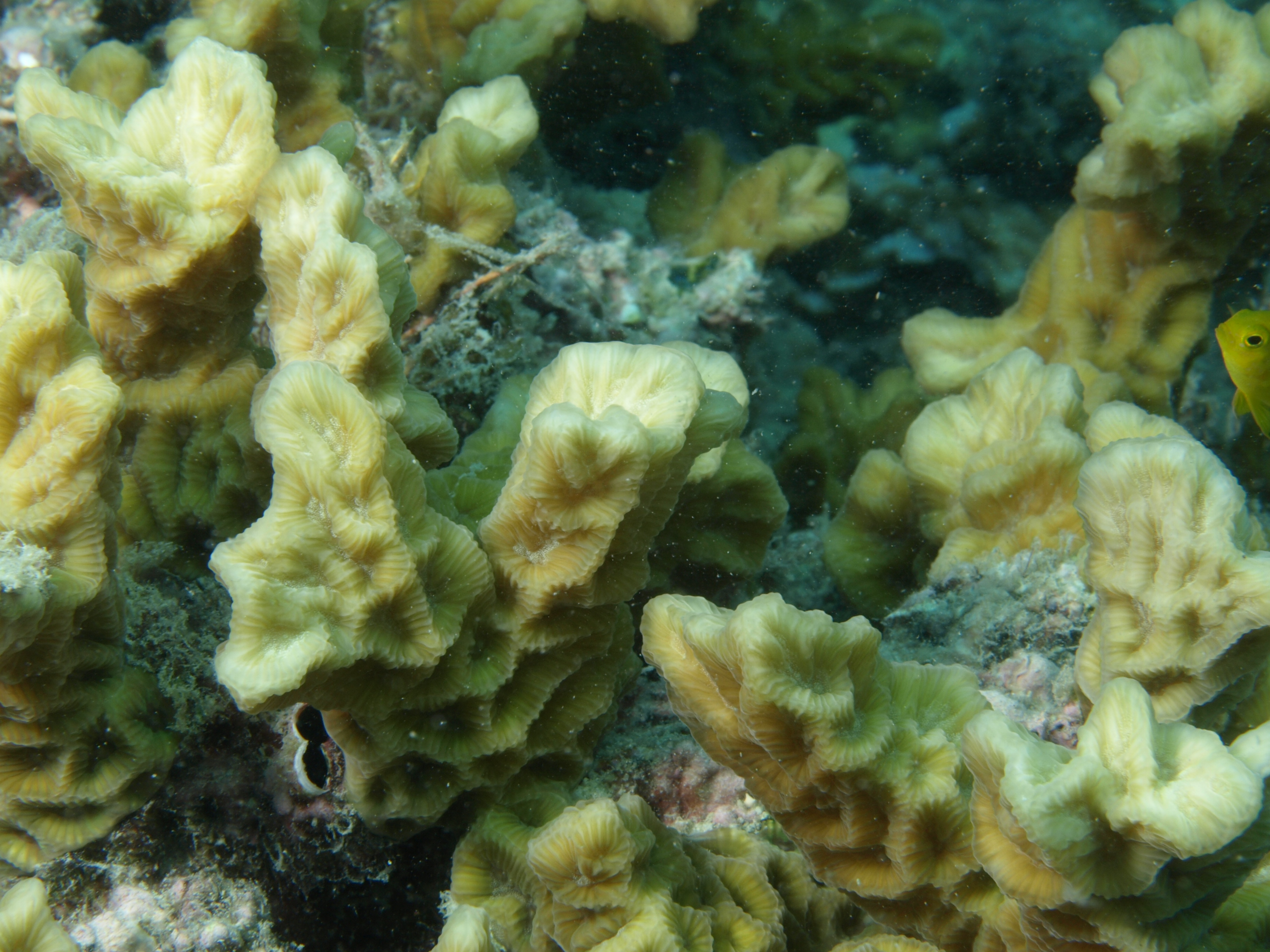
- Australogyra zelli from Aureed Island, Australia

Conservation status
- Least Concern (IUCN 3.1)

Scientific classification
- Kingdom: Animalia
- Phylum: Cnidaria
- Subphylum: Anthozoa
- Class: Hexacorallia
- Order: Scleractinia
- Family: Faviidae
- Genus: Australogyra; Veron & Pichon, 1982
- Species: A. zelli

Binomial name
- Australogyra zelli (Veron, Pichon & Best, 1977)

Synonyms
- Platygyra zelli Veron, Pichon & Best, 1977

= Australogyra =

Species of coral from the Indo-Pacific

Australogyra zelli is a species of stony coral native to the Central Indo-Pacific. It is the only species in the genus Australogyra. They are uncommon corals found in tropical waters to a range of up to 30 m (98 ft) deep. They can occur as branching growths or as hemispherical shapes reaching up to 2 m (6.6 ft) in diameter. Their color ranges from gray-green to a yellowish purple-brown. They are also sometimes known as the branching moon coral or the branching brain coral in the aquarium trade. The species is classified as Vulnerable by the IUCN Red List of Threatened Species. Their range includes Australia, the Solomon Islands, Papua New Guinea, Indonesia, the Philippines, Taiwan, southern China, Vietnam, Cambodia, Thailand, and Malaysia.

== See also ==
- Coral Triangle
