= List of Heptapleurum species =

As of November 2025, the following 321 species in the flowering plant genus Heptapleurum are accepted by Plants of the World Online. Heptapleurum was resurrected from Schefflera in 2020.

== A–B ==
- Heptapleurum actinophyllum (Endl.) Lowry & G.M.Plunkett
- Heptapleurum acuminatissimum (Merr.) Lowry & G.M.Plunkett
- Heptapleurum acutissimum (Miq.) Seem.
- Heptapleurum affine King
- Heptapleurum agamae (Merr.) Lowry & G.M.Plunkett
- Heptapleurum agasthiyamalayanum (Manickam, Murugan, Sundaresan & Jothi) Lowry & G.M.Plunkett
- Heptapleurum albidobracteatum (Elmer) Lowry & G.M.Plunkett
- Heptapleurum alongense (R.Vig.) Lowry & G.M.Plunkett
- Heptapleurum alpinum (Grushv. & Skvortsova) Lowry & G.M.Plunkett
- Heptapleurum altigenum (Frodin) Lowry & G.M.Plunkett
- Heptapleurum alvarezii (Merr.) Lowry & G.M.Plunkett
- Heptapleurum amungwiwae (Frodin) Lowry & G.M.Plunkett
- Heptapleurum angiense (Gibbs) Lowry & G.M.Plunkett
- Heptapleurum angilogense (Merr.) Lowry & G.M.Plunkett
- Heptapleurum angustifolium (Merr.) Lowry & G.M.Plunkett
- Heptapleurum apiculatum (Miq.) Seem.
- Heptapleurum arboricola Hayata
- Heptapleurum archboldianum (Philipson) Lowry & G.M.Plunkett
- Heptapleurum arfakense (Gibbs) Lowry & G.M.Plunkett
- Heptapleurum aromaticum (Blume) Boerl.
- Heptapleurum avene (Miq.) Seem.
- Heptapleurum banahaense (Merr.) Lowry & G.M.Plunkett
- Heptapleurum barbatum (Philipson) Lowry & G.M.Plunkett
- Heptapleurum beamanii (Puad, T.J.Barkman & Frodin) Puad, T.J.Barkman, Lowry & G.M.Plunkett
- Heptapleurum beccarianum (Harms) Lowry & G.M.Plunkett
- Heptapleurum bengalense (Gamble) Esser
- Heptapleurum benguetense (Merr.) Lowry & G.M.Plunkett
- Heptapleurum binuangense (C.B.Rob.) Lowry & G.M.Plunkett
- Heptapleurum bipalmatifolium (Merr.) Lowry & G.M.Plunkett
- Heptapleurum blancoi (Merr.) Lowry & G.M.Plunkett
- Heptapleurum bodinieri H.Lév.
- Heptapleurum bordenii (Merr.) Lowry & G.M.Plunkett
- Heptapleurum boridianum (Harms) Lowry & G.M.Plunkett
- Heptapleurum borneense (Merr.) Lowry & G.M.Plunkett
- Heptapleurum bougainvilleanum (Harms) Lowry & G.M.Plunkett
- Heptapleurum bourdillonii (Gamble) Lowry & G.M.Plunkett
- Heptapleurum bractescens (Ridl.) Lowry & G.M.Plunkett
- Heptapleurum brassaiellum (Ridl.) Lowry & G.M.Plunkett
- Heptapleurum brassii (Harms) Lowry & G.M.Plunkett
- Heptapleurum brevipedicellatum (Harms) Lowry & G.M.Plunkett
- Heptapleurum brevipes (Merr.) Lowry & G.M.Plunkett
- Heptapleurum bukidnonense (Merr.) Lowry & G.M.Plunkett
- Heptapleurum burkillii (Merr.) Lowry & G.M.Plunkett
- Heptapleurum buxifolioides (C.B.Shang) Lowry & G.M.Plunkett

== C–D ==
- Heptapleurum calyptratum (Hook.f. & Thomson) Y.F.Deng
- Heptapleurum cambodianum (Yahara & Tagane) Lowry & G.M.Plunkett
- Heptapleurum canaense (C.B.Shang) Lowry & G.M.Plunkett
- Heptapleurum capitatum (Wight & Arn.) Seem.
- Heptapleurum capituliferum (Merr.) Lowry & G.M.Plunkett
- Heptapleurum caroli (Harms) Lowry & G.M.Plunkett
- Heptapleurum carrii (Harms) Lowry & G.M.Plunkett
- Heptapleurum catanduanense (Merr.) Lowry & G.M.Plunkett
- Heptapleurum catense (Elmer) Lowry & G.M.Plunkett
- Heptapleurum caudatifolium (Merr.) Lowry & G.M.Plunkett
- Heptapleurum caudatum S.Vidal
- Heptapleurum cavaleriei H.Lév.
- Heptapleurum cephalotes C.B.Clarke
- Heptapleurum chaetorrhachis (Harms) Lowry & G.M.Plunkett
- Heptapleurum chandrasekharanii (Ramam. & Rajan) Lowry & G.M.Plunkett
- Heptapleurum chanii (T.J.Barkman, Puad & Frodin) T.J.Barkman, Puad, Lowry & G.M.Plunkett
- Heptapleurum chapanum (Harms) Lowry & G.M.Plunkett
- Heptapleurum chartaceum (Merr.) Lowry & G.M.Plunkett
- Heptapleurum chevalieri (C.B.Shang) Lowry & G.M.Plunkett
- Heptapleurum chinense (Dunn) Y.F.Deng
- Heptapleurum cinnamomeum (Merr.) Lowry & G.M.Plunkett
- Heptapleurum clarkei Lowry & G.M.Plunkett
- Heptapleurum clementis (Merr.) Lowry & G.M.Plunkett
- Heptapleurum corymbiforme (Bui) Lowry & G.M.Plunkett
- Heptapleurum crassibracteatum (C.B.Shang) Lowry & G.M.Plunkett
- Heptapleurum crassifolium (Merr.) Lowry & G.M.Plunkett
- Heptapleurum crassissimum (Merr.) Lowry & G.M.Plunkett
- Heptapleurum crenatum (Puad & Frodin) T.J.Barkman, Lowry & G.M.Plunkett
- Heptapleurum cumingii Seem.
- Heptapleurum cuneatum (Craib) Lowry & G.M.Plunkett
- Heptapleurum curranii (Merr.) Lowry & G.M.Plunkett
- Heptapleurum delavayi Franch.
- Heptapleurum demesae (Merr.) Lowry & G.M.Plunkett
- Heptapleurum dentatum (Frodin) Lowry & G.M.Plunkett
- Heptapleurum digitatum (Wall. ex Loudon) Lowry & G.M.Plunkett
- Heptapleurum divaricatum (Blume) Seem.
- Heptapleurum dongnaiense (Bui) Lowry & G.M.Plunkett

== E–H ==
- Heptapleurum ellipticum (Blume) Seem.
- Heptapleurum elliptifoliolum (Merr.) Lowry & G.M.Plunkett
- Heptapleurum emarginatum (Moon) Seem.
- Heptapleurum enneaphyllum (Bui) Lowry & G.M.Plunkett
- Heptapleurum eriocephalum (Harms) Lowry & G.M.Plunkett
- Heptapleurum eucaudatum (Merr.) Lowry & G.M.Plunkett
- Heptapleurum exaltatum (Thwaites) Seem.
- Heptapleurum fantsipanense (Bui) Lowry & G.M.Plunkett
- Heptapleurum farinosum (Blume) Lowry & G.M.Plunkett
- Heptapleurum fastigiatum (Miq.) Seem.
- Heptapleurum fengii (C.J.Tseng & G.Hoo) Lowry & G.M.Plunkett
- Heptapleurum feriarum (Frodin) Lowry & G.M.Plunkett
- Heptapleurum filipes (Merr.) Lowry & G.M.Plunkett
- Heptapleurum fimbriatum F.Muell.
- Heptapleurum foetidum (Merr.) Lowry & G.M.Plunkett
- Heptapleurum forbesii (Ridl.) Lowry & G.M.Plunkett
- Heptapleurum foxworthyi (Merr.) Lowry & G.M.Plunkett
- Heptapleurum frodinii de Kok
- Heptapleurum gigantifolium (Merr.) Lowry & G.M.Plunkett
- Heptapleurum gjellerupii (Harms) Lowry & G.M.Plunkett
- Heptapleurum glabrescens (C.J.Tseng & G.Hoo) Lowry & G.M.Plunkett
- Heptapleurum glabrum (Merr.) Lowry & G.M.Plunkett
- Heptapleurum glaucum Kurz
- Heptapleurum globosum (Merr.) Lowry & G.M.Plunkett
- Heptapleurum globuliferum (Grushv. & Skvortsova) Lowry & G.M.Plunkett
- Heptapleurum glomerulatum Ridl.
- Heptapleurum gracile (Miq.) Blume ex Seem.
- Heptapleurum gracilipes (Merr.) Lowry & G.M.Plunkett
- Heptapleurum griffithii (Seem.) ined.
- Heptapleurum guizhouense (C.B.Shang) Lowry & G.M.Plunkett
- Heptapleurum hainanense (Merr. & Chun) Lowry & G.M.Plunkett
- Heptapleurum halconense (Merr.) Lowry & G.M.Plunkett
- Heptapleurum havilandii (Merr.) Lowry & G.M.Plunkett
- Heptapleurum hellwigianum (Harms) Lowry & G.M.Plunkett
- Heptapleurum hemiepiphyticum (Grushv. & Skvortsova) Lowry & G.M.Plunkett
- Heptapleurum heptaphyllum (L.) Y.F.Deng
- Heptapleurum heterobotryum (Frodin) Lowry & G.M.Plunkett
- Heptapleurum heterocladum (Frodin) Lowry & G.M.Plunkett
- Heptapleurum heterophyllum (Wall. ex G.Don) Seem.
- Heptapleurum hirsutum (Philipson) Lowry & G.M.Plunkett
- Heptapleurum hoi Dunn
- Heptapleurum hullettii King
- Heptapleurum hunsteinianum (Harms) Lowry & G.M.Plunkett
- Heptapleurum hypoleucoides (Harms) Lowry & G.M.Plunkett
- Heptapleurum hypoleucum Kurz

== I–L ==
- Heptapleurum insculptum (Frodin) Lowry & G.M.Plunkett
- Heptapleurum insigne (C.N.Ho) Lowry & G.M.Plunkett
- Heptapleurum insularum Seem.
- Heptapleurum ischnoacrum (Harms) Lowry & G.M.Plunkett
- Heptapleurum ischyrocephalum (Harms) Lowry & G.M.Plunkett
- Heptapleurum janowskyi (Harms) Lowry & G.M.Plunkett
- Heptapleurum junghuhnianum (Miq.) Seem.
- Heptapleurum kajonense (Harms) Lowry & G.M.Plunkett
- Heptapleurum kaniense (Harms) Lowry & G.M.Plunkett
- Heptapleurum khasianum C.B.Clarke
- Heptapleurum kinabaluense (Puad, T.J.Barkman & Frodin) Lowry & G.M.Plunkett
- Heptapleurum kontumense (Bui) Lowry & G.M.Plunkett
- Heptapleurum koordersii (Harms) Lowry & G.M.Plunkett
- Heptapleurum koresii (P.Royen) Lowry & G.M.Plunkett
- Heptapleurum kornasii (Grushv. & Skvortsova) Lowry & G.M.Plunkett
- Heptapleurum kraemeri (Harms) Lowry & G.M.Plunkett
- Heptapleurum kuborense (Frodin) Lowry & G.M.Plunkett
- Heptapleurum kuchingense (Merr.) Lowry & G.M.Plunkett
- Heptapleurum lakhonense (C.B.Shang) Lowry & G.M.Plunkett
- Heptapleurum lanatum (Frodin, Puad & T.J.Barkman) Puad, T.J.Barkman, Lowry & G.M.Plunkett
- Heptapleurum lanceolatum (Ridl.) Lowry & G.M.Plunkett
- Heptapleurum lasiocalyx (Ridl.) Lowry & G.M.Plunkett
- Heptapleurum lasiosphaerum (Harms) Lowry & G.M.Plunkett
- Heptapleurum latifoliolatum King
- Heptapleurum lawranceanum Prain
- Heptapleurum laxiflorum (Ridl.) Lowry & G.M.Plunkett
- Heptapleurum laxiusculum (Grushv. & Skvortsova) Lowry & G.M.Plunkett
- Heptapleurum leiophyllum (Harms) Lowry & G.M.Plunkett
- Heptapleurum lengguanii de Kok
- Heptapleurum lenticellatum (C.B.Shang) Lowry & G.M.Plunkett
- Heptapleurum leroyianum (C.B.Shang) Lowry & G.M.Plunkett
- Heptapleurum leucanthum (R.Vig.) Y.F.Deng
- Heptapleurum leytense (Merr.) Lowry & G.M.Plunkett
- Heptapleurum lineamentorum (Frodin & Puad) Puad, T.J.Barkman, Lowry & G.M.Plunkett
- Heptapleurum littorale (Miq.) Boerl.
- Heptapleurum littoreum (Seem.) Lowry & G.M.Plunkett
- Heptapleurum locianum (Grushv. & Skvortsova) Y.F.Deng
- Heptapleurum longicaudatum de Kok
- Heptapleurum longifolium (Blume) Seem.
- Heptapleurum longifrutescens (Elmer) Lowry & G.M.Plunkett
- Heptapleurum lorentzii (Harms) Lowry & G.M.Plunkett
- Heptapleurum lucescens (Blume) Lowry & G.M.Plunkett
- Heptapleurum luridum King
- Heptapleurum luzoniense (Merr.) Lowry & G.M.Plunkett

== M–N ==
- Heptapleurum macgregorii (Merr.) G.M.Plunkett & Lowry
- Heptapleurum macranthum (Merr.) G.M.Plunkett & Lowry
- Heptapleurum macrophyllum Dunn
- Heptapleurum macrostachyum (Benth.) Scheff.
- Heptapleurum maduraiense (K.Ravik. & V.Lakshm.) G.M.Plunkett & Lowry
- Heptapleurum mamutiacum (Puad, T.J.Barkman & Frodin) Puad, T.J.Barkman, G.M.Plunkett & Lowry
- Heptapleurum mangiferifolium (Frodin & Puad) Puad, T.J.Barkman, G.M.Plunkett & Lowry
- Heptapleurum marlipoense (C.J.Tseng & G.Hoo) G.M.Plunkett & Lowry
- Heptapleurum matsallehii (T.J.Barkman, Puad & Frodin) T.J.Barkman, Puad, G.M.Plunkett & Lowry
- Heptapleurum megalanthum (Harms) G.M.Plunkett & Lowry
- Heptapleurum membranifolium (Bui) G.M.Plunkett & Lowry
- Heptapleurum merrillii (Elmer) G.M.Plunkett & Lowry
- Heptapleurum merrittii (Frodin) G.M.Plunkett & Lowry
- Heptapleurum metcalfianum (Merr. ex H.L.Li) G.M.Plunkett & Lowry
- Heptapleurum microgyne (Harms) G.M.Plunkett & Lowry
- Heptapleurum microphyllum (Merr.) G.M.Plunkett & Lowry
- Heptapleurum minahasae (Harms) G.M.Plunkett & Lowry
- Heptapleurum minutipetiolatum (Frodin) G.M.Plunkett & Lowry
- Heptapleurum minutistellatum (Merr. ex H.L.Li) Y.F.Deng
- Heptapleurum mitragerum (Frodin & Puad) Puad, T.J.Barkman, G.M.Plunkett & Lowry
- Heptapleurum mjoebergii (Merr.) G.M.Plunkett & Lowry
- Heptapleurum monticola (Ridl.) G.M.Plunkett & Lowry
- Heptapleurum morobeanum (Harms) G.M.Plunkett & Lowry
- Heptapleurum multiflorum (Merr.) G.M.Plunkett & Lowry
- Heptapleurum multifoliolatum (Merr.) G.M.Plunkett & Lowry
- Heptapleurum multinervium (H.L.Li) G.M.Plunkett & Lowry
- Heptapleurum multiramosum (Elmer) G.M.Plunkett & Lowry
- Heptapleurum multispicatum (Puad & Frodin) Puad, T.J.Barkman, G.M.Plunkett & Lowry
- Heptapleurum myrianthellum (Merr.) G.M.Plunkett & Lowry
- Heptapleurum myriocarpum (Harms) G.M.Plunkett & Lowry
- Heptapleurum nabirense (Philipson) G.M.Plunkett & Lowry
- Heptapleurum nanocephalum de Kok
- Heptapleurum napuoense (C.B.Shang) G.M.Plunkett & Lowry
- Heptapleurum nervosum King
- Heptapleurum nhatrangense (C.B.Shang) G.M.Plunkett & Lowry
- Heptapleurum nodosum (Miq.) G.M.Plunkett & Lowry

== O–P ==
- Heptapleurum obliquum (Merr.) G.M.Plunkett & Lowry
- Heptapleurum oblongifolium (Merr.) G.M.Plunkett & Lowry
- Heptapleurum obovatifoliolatum (C.B.Shang) G.M.Plunkett & Lowry
- Heptapleurum obovatilimbum (Frodin & Puad) Puad, T.J.Barkman, G.M.Plunkett & Lowry
- Heptapleurum obovatum (Wight) Bedd.
- Heptapleurum obtusifolium (Merr.) G.M.Plunkett & Lowry
- Heptapleurum octandrum (Ridl.) G.M.Plunkett & Lowry
- Heptapleurum oligodon (Harms) G.M.Plunkett & Lowry
- Heptapleurum opacum (Puad, T.J.Barkman & Frodin) Puad, T.J.Barkman, G.M.Plunkett & Lowry
- Heptapleurum oreopolum (Harms) G.M.Plunkett & Lowry
- Heptapleurum ovoideum (Merr.) G.M.Plunkett & Lowry
- Heptapleurum oxyphyllum (Miq.) Seem.
- Heptapleurum pachyphlebium (Merr.) G.M.Plunkett & Lowry
- Heptapleurum pachystylum (Harms) G.M.Plunkett & Lowry
- Heptapleurum pacoense (Grushv. & Skvortsova) G.M.Plunkett & Lowry
- Heptapleurum pagiophyllum (Harms) G.M.Plunkett & Lowry
- Heptapleurum palawanense (Merr.) G.M.Plunkett & Lowry
- Heptapleurum palmiforme (Grushv. & Skvortsova) G.M.Plunkett & Lowry
- Heptapleurum panayense (Merr.) G.M.Plunkett & Lowry
- Heptapleurum papuanum (Ridl.) G.M.Plunkett & Lowry
- Heptapleurum parasiticum (Blume) Seem.
- Heptapleurum parvifoliolatum (C.J.Tseng & G.Hoo) Y.F.Deng
- Heptapleurum pauciflorum (R.Vig.) Y.F.Deng
- Heptapleurum pawoiense (Frodin) G.M.Plunkett & Lowry
- Heptapleurum peridotiticola (Puad, T.J.Barkman & Frodin) Puad, T.J.Barkman, G.M.Plunkett & Lowry
- Heptapleurum pes-avis (R.Vig.) Y.F.Deng
- Heptapleurum petelotii (Merr.) G.M.Plunkett & Lowry
- Heptapleurum petiolosum (Miq.) Seem.
- Heptapleurum phanerophlebium (Merr.) G.M.Plunkett & Lowry
- Heptapleurum philippinense G.M.Plunkett & Lowry
- Heptapleurum pilematophorum (Harms) G.M.Plunkett & Lowry
- Heptapleurum piperoideum (Elmer) G.M.Plunkett & Lowry
- Heptapleurum platyphyllum (Merr.) G.M.Plunkett & Lowry
- Heptapleurum poilaneanum (C.B.Shang) G.M.Plunkett & Lowry
- Heptapleurum politum (Miq.) Seem.
- Heptapleurum polyandrum (Ridl.) G.M.Plunkett & Lowry
- Heptapleurum polyastrum (Harms) G.M.Plunkett & Lowry
- Heptapleurum polybotryum (Miq.) Seem.
- Heptapleurum polychaetum (Harms) G.M.Plunkett & Lowry
- Heptapleurum polycladum (Frodin) G.M.Plunkett & Lowry
- Heptapleurum poomae (Esser & Jebb) Esser
- Heptapleurum porphyrantherum (Ridl.) G.M.Plunkett & Lowry
- Heptapleurum pseudobrassaium (Harms) G.M.Plunkett & Lowry
- Heptapleurum pseudospicatum (Bui) G.M.Plunkett & Lowry
- Heptapleurum pushpangadanii (Chakrab.) G.M.Plunkett & Lowry

== Q–S ==
- Heptapleurum quadripetalum (Merr.) G.M.Plunkett & Lowry
- Heptapleurum quangtriense (C.B.Shang) G.M.Plunkett & Lowry
- Heptapleurum racemosum (Wight) Bedd.
- Heptapleurum reinianum (Frodin) G.M.Plunkett & Lowry
- Heptapleurum remotiserratum (Merr.) G.M.Plunkett & Lowry
- Heptapleurum reticulatum (Philipson) G.M.Plunkett & Lowry
- Heptapleurum rhododendrifolium (Griff.) G.M.Plunkett & Lowry
- Heptapleurum rhynchocarpum (Merr.) G.M.Plunkett & Lowry
- Heptapleurum ridleyi King
- Heptapleurum rigidum (Blume) Hassk.
- Heptapleurum rostratum (Wight) Bedd.
- Heptapleurum rudolfi (Harms) G.M.Plunkett & Lowry
- Heptapleurum rugosum (Blume) Boerl.
- Heptapleurum sabahense (Frodin & Puad) Puad, T.J.Barkman, G.M.Plunkett & Lowry
- Heptapleurum santosii (Merr.) G.M.Plunkett & Lowry
- Heptapleurum sarasinorum (Harms ex Koord.) G.M.Plunkett & Lowry
- Heptapleurum scandens (Blume) Seem.
- Heptapleurum schizophyllum Hance
- Heptapleurum schultzei (Harms) G.M.Plunkett & Lowry
- Heptapleurum schumannianum (Harms) G.M.Plunkett & Lowry
- Heptapleurum scytinophyllum (Harms) G.M.Plunkett & Lowry
- Heptapleurum secundum (Philipson) G.M.Plunkett & Lowry
- Heptapleurum sepikianum (Harms) G.M.Plunkett & Lowry
- Heptapleurum serpentinicola (Puad & Frodin) Puad, T.J.Barkman, G.M.Plunkett & Lowry
- Heptapleurum serratum (Miq.) Seem.
- Heptapleurum sessile (Miq.) Boerl.
- Heptapleurum setulosum (Harms) G.M.Plunkett & Lowry
- Heptapleurum shweliense (W.W.Sm.) G.M.Plunkett & Lowry
- Heptapleurum siamense (W.W.Sm. ex Craib) G.M.Plunkett & Lowry
- Heptapleurum sibayakense (Merr.) G.M.Plunkett & Lowry
- Heptapleurum simbuense (Frodin) G.M.Plunkett & Lowry
- Heptapleurum simplicifolium (Merr.) G.M.Plunkett & Lowry
- Heptapleurum singalangense (Miq.) Seem.
- Heptapleurum singulare (B.C.Stone) G.M.Plunkett & Lowry
- Heptapleurum spaniodon (Harms) G.M.Plunkett & Lowry
- Heptapleurum stellatum Gaertn.
- Heptapleurum stellulatum (Merr.) G.M.Plunkett & Lowry
- Heptapleurum stenopetalum (Harms) G.M.Plunkett & Lowry
- Heptapleurum stenophyllum (Harms) G.M.Plunkett & Lowry
- Heptapleurum stolleanum (Harms) G.M.Plunkett & Lowry
- Heptapleurum stramineum (Frodin) G.M.Plunkett & Lowry
- Heptapleurum subavene (Blume) Hassk.
- Heptapleurum subdivaricatum (Merr. ex Frodin) G.M.Plunkett & Lowry
- Heptapleurum subintegrum (Craib) G.M.Plunkett & Lowry

== T–Z ==
- Heptapleurum taiwanianum (Nakai) G.M.Plunkett & Lowry
- Heptapleurum tambuyukonense (T.J.Barkman, Puad & Frodin) T.J.Barkman, Puad, G.M.Plunkett & Lowry
- Heptapleurum tanjiewhoeianum (Frodin & Puad) Puad, T.J.Barkman, G.M.Plunkett & Lowry
- Heptapleurum tanyrhachis (Harms) G.M.Plunkett & Lowry
- Heptapleurum tanytrichum (Harms) G.M.Plunkett & Lowry
- Heptapleurum tetrandrum (Merr.) G.M.Plunkett & Lowry
- Heptapleurum thaumasianthum (Harms) G.M.Plunkett & Lowry
- Heptapleurum tribracteolatum (Bui) G.M.Plunkett & Lowry
- Heptapleurum trineurum (Frodin & Puad) Puad, T.J.Barkman, G.M.Plunkett & Lowry
- Heptapleurum triste King
- Heptapleurum truncatifructum (Puad, T.J.Barkman & Frodin) Puad, T.J.Barkman, G.M.Plunkett & Lowry
- Heptapleurum trungii (Grushv. & Skvortsova) G.M.Plunkett & Lowry
- Heptapleurum tunkinense (R.Vig.) G.M.Plunkett & Lowry
- Heptapleurum urdanetense (Elmer) G.M.Plunkett & Lowry
- Heptapleurum venulosum (Wight & Arn.) Seem.
- Heptapleurum versteegii (Harms) G.M.Plunkett & Lowry
- Heptapleurum vidalianum (C.B.Shang) G.M.Plunkett & Lowry
- Heptapleurum violeum (C.B.Shang) G.M.Plunkett & Lowry
- Heptapleurum viridicephalum (Puad & Frodin) Puad, T.J.Barkman, G.M.Plunkett & Lowry
- Heptapleurum wallichianum (Wight & Arn.) Seem.
- Heptapleurum wardii (C.Marquand & Airy Shaw) G.M.Plunkett & Lowry
- Heptapleurum waterhousei (Harms) G.M.Plunkett & Lowry
- Heptapleurum winkleri (Harms) G.M.Plunkett & Lowry
- Heptapleurum wrayi King
- Heptapleurum yatesii (Merr.) G.M.Plunkett & Lowry
- Heptapleurum zhuanum (Lowry & C.B.Shang) G.M.Plunkett & Lowry
