= Heptapleurum multinervium =

Conservation status
- Vulnerable (IUCN 3.1)

Scientific classification
- Kingdom: Plantae
- Clade: Tracheophytes
- Clade: Angiosperms
- Clade: Eudicots
- Clade: Asterids
- Order: Apiales
- Family: Araliaceae
- Genus: Heptapleurum
- Species: H. multinervium

Binomial name
- Heptapleurum multinervium (H.L.Li) G.M.Plunkett & Lowry (2020)

Synonyms
- Agalma multinervium (H.L.Li) Hutch. (1967); Schefflera multinervia H.L.Li (1942)

Species of flowering plant

Heptapleurum multinervium is a species of flowering plant in the family Araliaceae. It is endemic to Yunnan Province of China.
