= Heptapleurum bourdillonii =

Conservation status
- Endangered (IUCN 2.3)

Scientific classification
- Kingdom: Plantae
- Clade: Tracheophytes
- Clade: Angiosperms
- Clade: Eudicots
- Clade: Asterids
- Order: Apiales
- Family: Araliaceae
- Genus: Heptapleurum
- Species: H. bourdillonii

Binomial name
- Heptapleurum bourdillonii (Gamble) Lowry & G.M.Plunkett

Synonyms
- Schefflera bourdillonii Gamble (1919)

Species of flowering plant

Heptapleurum bourdillonii is a species of plant in the family Araliaceae. It is a shrub or small tree endemic to Kerala in India. It has been collected in the Travancore Hills in the southern Western Ghats, where it grows in montane rain forest.
