= Heptapleurum albidobracteatum =

Conservation status
- Endangered (IUCN 3.1)

Scientific classification
- Kingdom: Plantae
- Clade: Tracheophytes
- Clade: Angiosperms
- Clade: Eudicots
- Clade: Asterids
- Order: Apiales
- Family: Araliaceae
- Genus: Heptapleurum
- Species: H. albidobracteatum

Binomial name
- Heptapleurum albidobracteatum (Elmer) Lowry & G.M.Plunkett (2020)

Synonyms
- Schefflera albidobracteata Elmer (1914)

Species of flowering plant

Heptapleurum albidobracteatum is a species of plant in the family Araliaceae. It is an epiphytic shrub or a small tree endemic to the Philippines. It is known from Cebu, Leyte, and Bukidnon and Agusan provinces of Mindanao, where it grows in montane forests. The species has an estimated area of occupancy (AOO) of 16 km^{2}, and an estimated extent of occurrence (EOO) of 30,697 km^{2}.
