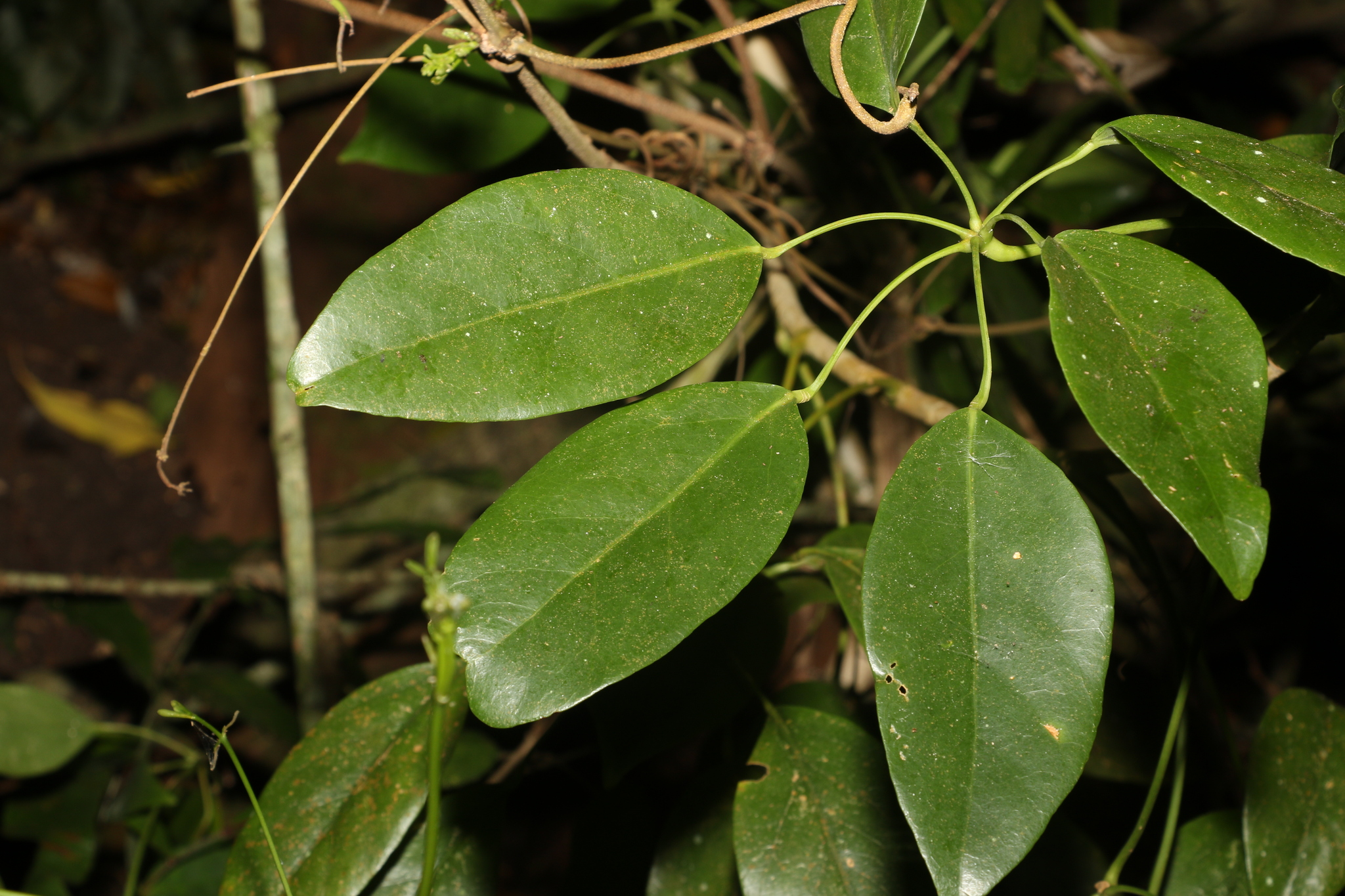

Conservation status
- Least Concern (NCA)
- Least Concern (IUCN 3.1)

Scientific classification
- Kingdom: Plantae
- Clade: Tracheophytes
- Clade: Angiosperms
- Clade: Eudicots
- Clade: Asterids
- Order: Apiales
- Family: Araliaceae
- Genus: Heptapleurum
- Species: H. ellipticum

Binomial name
- Heptapleurum ellipticum (Blume) Seem.

Synonyms
- Paratropia elliptica (Blume) Miq.; Schefflera elliptica (Blume) Harms; Sciodaphyllum ellipticum Blume

= Heptapleurum ellipticum =

Climbing umbrella tree

Species of flowering plant

Heptapleurum ellipticum, commonly known in Australia as the climbing umbrella tree, is a plant in the family Araliaceae native to the Indian subcontinent, Indochina, Malesia, Papuasia and Australia.

== Description ==
The climbing umbrella tree is a vine or scandent shrub growing up to 10 m (33 ft) high and a stem diameter of up to 9 cm (3.5 in).

The alternately arranged leaves have a petiole measuring 4 to 14 cm (1.6 to 5.5 in) long. They are compound with 4 to 7 leaflets arranged palmately. Each leaflet measures around 6 to 18 cm (2.4 to 7.1 in) long by 2.5 to 10 cm (0.98 to 3.94 in) wide. They are leathery and glabrous with usually 5-6 pairs of secondary veins.

The inflorescence is about 24 cm (9.4 in) long, with flowers arranged in umbels. The globose fruit are very small, about 4–6 mm (0.16–0.24 in) in diameter.

== Taxonomy ==
This species was first described as Sciodaphyllum ellipticum in 1826 by the Dutch botanist Carl Ludwig Blume, based on material collected near Mount Salak, Indonesia. In 1865 it was transferred to the genus Heptapleurum by Berthold Carl Seemann, then to Schefflera by Hermann Harms in 1894, where it remained for more than a century. In 2020 Porter P. Lowry II and Gregory M. Plunkett published a paper in which they resurrected the genus Heptapleurum and transferred a large number of species − including this one − to it from Schlefflera.

== Distribution and habitat ==
The natural range of the climbing umbrella tree is from India through Southeast Asia and Southern China, Melanesia, Papuasia, Christmas Island and northern Australia. In Australia it is restricted to the northeastern parts of Queensland. It grows in mainly in rainforest and gallery forest from near sea level up to 2,500 m (8,200 ft).

== Uses ==
The plant has been used in traditional medicine as a treatment for a number of ailments, including coughs, edema, toothache and wounds.

== Gallery ==
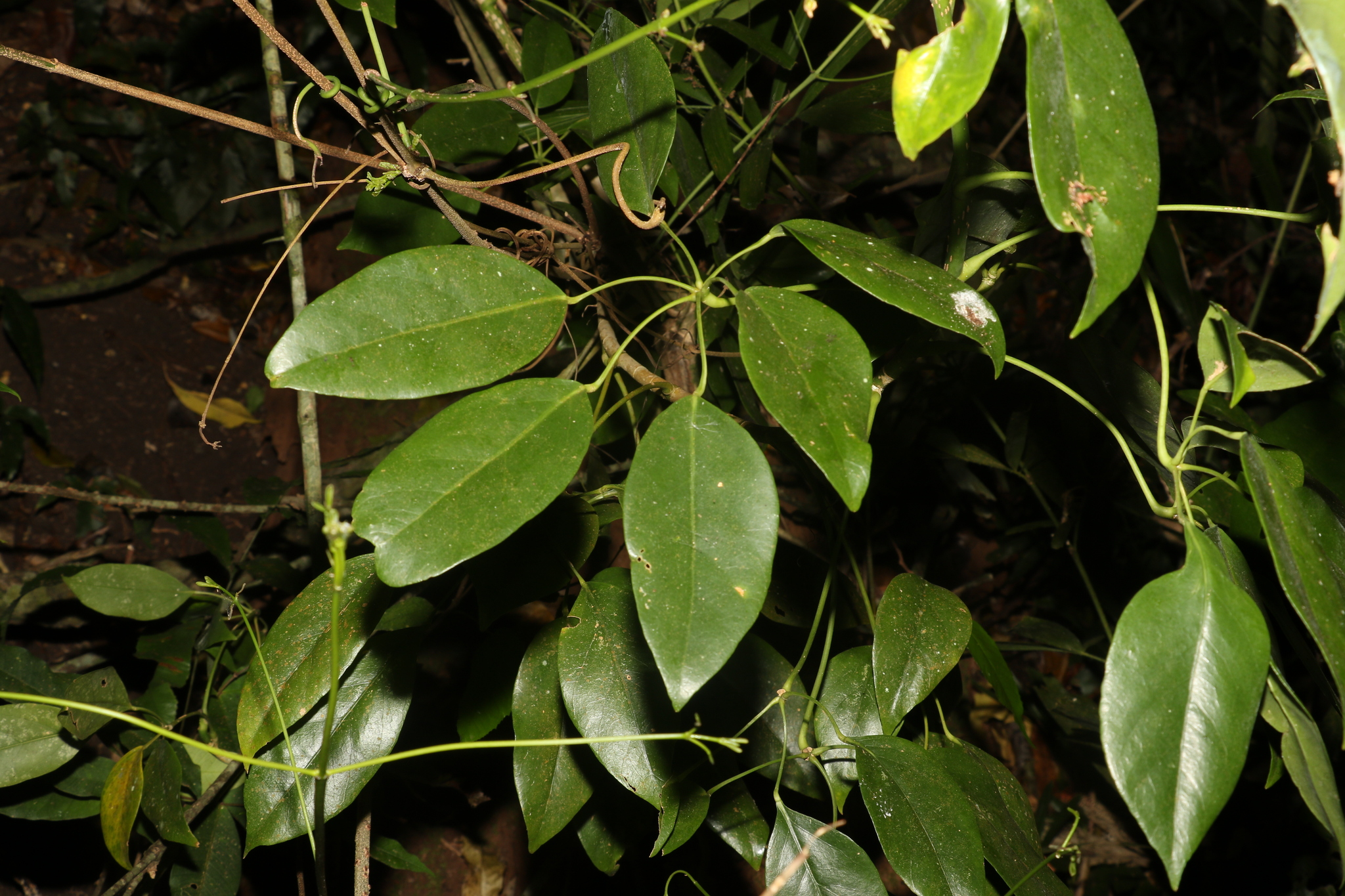
Foliage

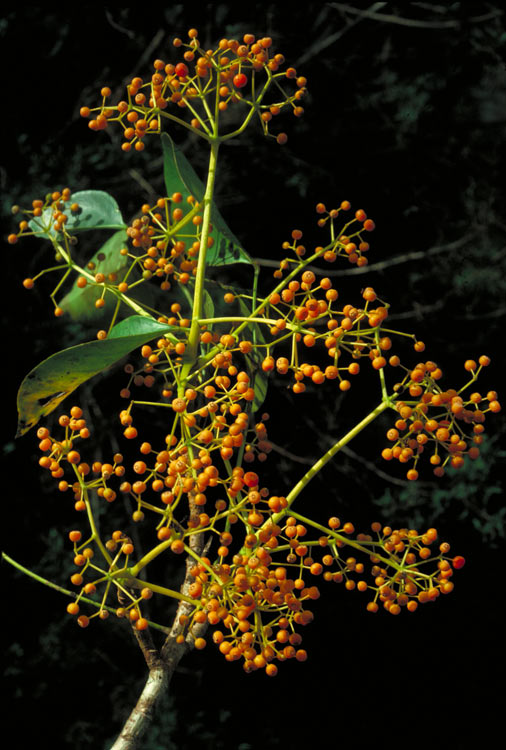
Fruit

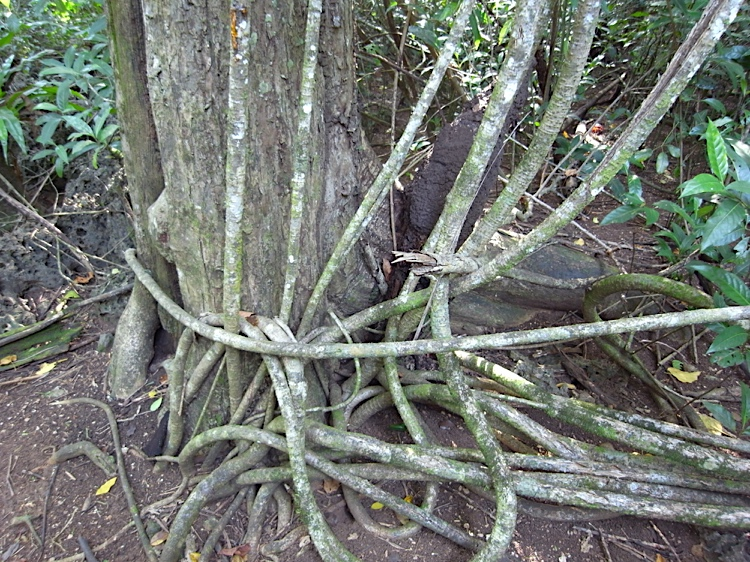
Stems coiled on the ground

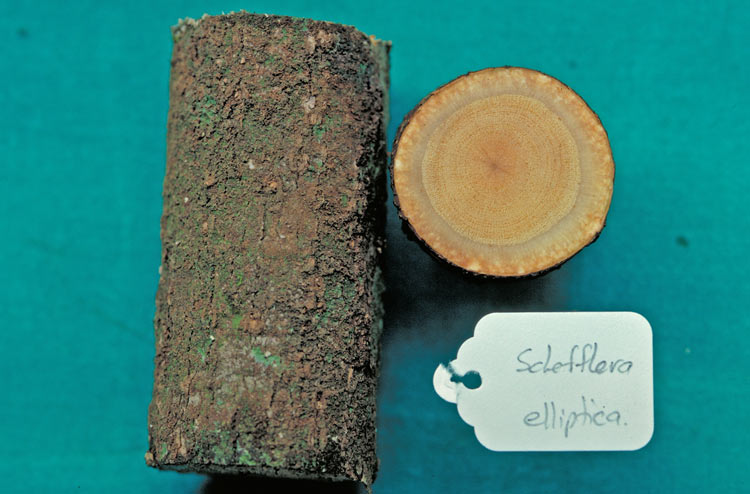
Cross section of stem
