= S. polyclada =

S. polyclada may refer to:

- Schefflera polyclada, a plant endemic to Papua New Guinea
- Scorzonera polyclada, a flowering plant
