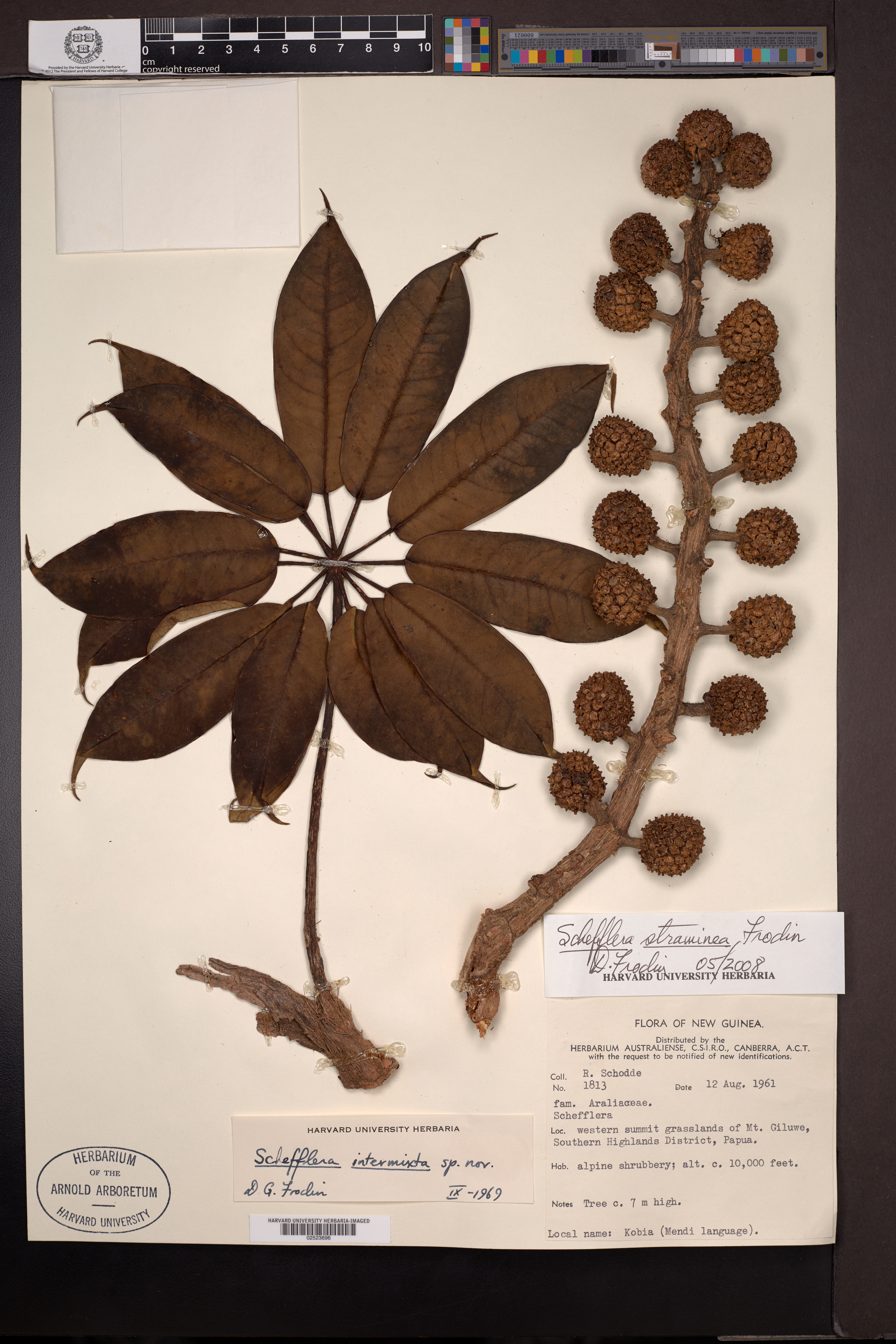

Conservation status
- Near Threatened (IUCN 3.1)

Scientific classification
- Kingdom: Plantae
- Clade: Tracheophytes
- Clade: Angiosperms
- Clade: Eudicots
- Clade: Asterids
- Order: Apiales
- Family: Araliaceae
- Genus: Heptapleurum
- Species: H. stramineum

Binomial name
- Heptapleurum stramineum (Frodin) G.M.Plunkett & Lowry (2020)

Synonyms
- Schefflera straminea Frodin (1983)

= Heptapleurum stramineum =

Species of flowering plant

Heptapleurum stramineum is a species of flowering plant in the family Araliaceae. It is a scrambling tree endemic to Papua New Guinea.

Heptapleurum stramineum may grow as a tree up to 10 meters high, or as a multi-stemmed epiphytic shrub growing on other trees. It is likely insect-pollinated, and its fruit and seeds dispersed by birds.

Heptapleurum stramineum is native to the New Guinea Highlands. It has been found at Mount Hagen, Mount Giluwe, Mount Bosavi, Mount Jalibu, the Doma Peaks, and nearby mountainous areas of Western Highlands and Southern Highlands provinces and southern Enga Province.

It grows in montane rain forests and subalpine shrublands from 1,800 up to 4,025 meters elevation. It grows at the edges of subalpine shrublands, in subalpine grassland, in open montane or secondary subalpine shrublands, and in montane forests with species of Castanopsis, Nothofagus, and conifers.
