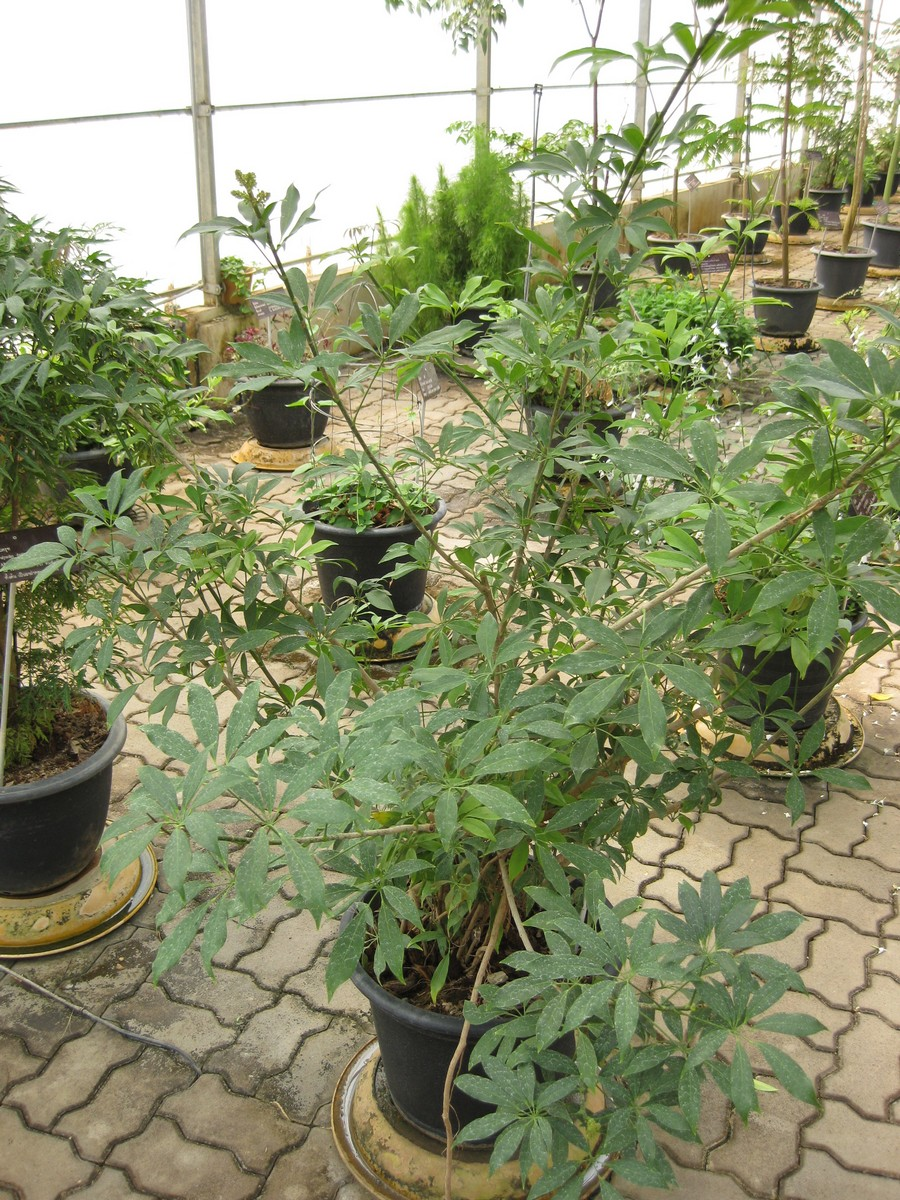

Conservation status
- Least Concern (IUCN 3.1)

Scientific classification
- Kingdom: Plantae
- Clade: Tracheophytes
- Clade: Angiosperms
- Clade: Eudicots
- Clade: Asterids
- Order: Apiales
- Family: Araliaceae
- Genus: Heptapleurum
- Species: H. leucanthum

Binomial name
- Heptapleurum leucanthum (R.Vig.) Y.F.Deng (2018)

Synonyms
- Schefflera kwangsiensis Merr. ex H.L.Li (1942); Schefflera leucantha R.Vig. (1909); Schefflera tamdaoensis Grushv. & Skvortsova (1969); Schefflera tenuis H.L.Li (1942); Schefflera yunnanensis H.L.Li (1942)

= Heptapleurum leucanthum =

Species of flowering plant

Heptapleurum leucanthum is a species of flowering plant in the family Araliaceae and is native to south-central and southeast China (northwestern Yunnan and southwestern Guangxi), Laos, and Vietnam.
