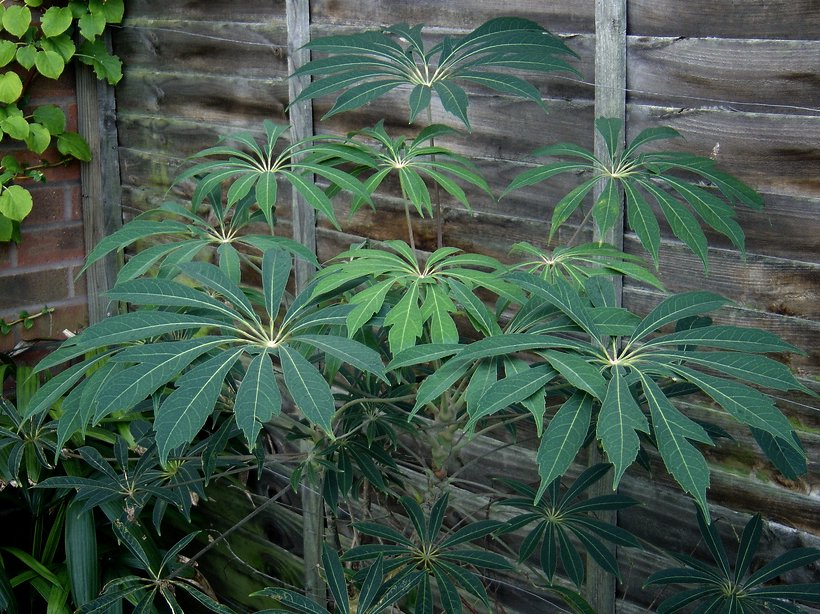

Conservation status
- Least Concern (IUCN 2.3)

Scientific classification
- Kingdom: Plantae
- Clade: Tracheophytes
- Clade: Angiosperms
- Clade: Eudicots
- Clade: Asterids
- Order: Apiales
- Family: Araliaceae
- Genus: Heptapleurum
- Species: H. taiwanianum

Binomial name
- Heptapleurum taiwanianum (Nakai) G.M.Plunkett & Lowry

Synonyms
- Agalma taiwanianum Nakai; Schefflera taiwaniana (Nakai) Kaneh.

= Heptapleurum taiwanianum =

Species of flowering plant

Heptapleurum taiwanianum (syn. Schefflera taiwaniana, 台灣鵝掌藤) is a species of flowering plant in the family Araliaceae, native to Taiwan, where it is scattered throughout coniferous forests at 2,000–3,000 m (6,600–9,800 ft). Growing to 4 m (13 ft) tall by 2.5 m (8.2 ft) broad, it is an evergreen shrub or small tree. Large leaves up to 15 cm (5.9 in) long are composed of up to 11 ovate leaflets arranged radially around a central stalk (palmately compound). Young leaves are covered in silver hairs, while mature leaves have a smooth surface. Sprays of flowers in late summer are followed by dark berries in winter - a valued food source for insects and birds.

Related to the ivies (Hedera), Heptapleurum taiwanianum is one of several species in the hugely varied genus Heptapleurum that are grown ornamentally for their handsome foliage. Once mature it is hardy down to −10 °C (14 °F), though young plants may require some frost protection. It benefits from being planted in a sheltered spot with other plants to provide enough humidity. It has gained the Royal Horticultural Society's Award of Garden Merit.
