= Heptapleurum nervosum =

Conservation status
- Vulnerable (IUCN 2.3)

Scientific classification
- Kingdom: Plantae
- Clade: Tracheophytes
- Clade: Angiosperms
- Clade: Eudicots
- Clade: Asterids
- Order: Apiales
- Family: Araliaceae
- Genus: Heptapleurum
- Species: H. nervosum

Binomial name
- Heptapleurum nervosum King (1898)

Synonyms
- Schefflera nervosa (King) R.Vig.

Species of flowering plant

Heptapleurum nervosum is a species of flowering plant in the family Araliaceae. It is a tree endemic to Peninsular Malaysia. It is threatened by habitat loss.
