= Heptapleurum violeum =

Scientific classification
- Kingdom: Plantae
- Clade: Tracheophytes
- Clade: Angiosperms
- Clade: Eudicots
- Clade: Asterids
- Order: Apiales
- Family: Araliaceae
- Genus: Heptapleurum
- Species: H. violeum

Binomial name
- Heptapleurum violeum (C.B.Shang) G.M.Plunkett & Lowry (2020)

Synonyms
- Schefflera violea C.B.Shang (1984)

Species of flowering plant

Heptapleurum violeum is a species of flowering plant in the family Araliaceae. It is endemic to Vietnam.
