= Heptapleurum alpinum =

Scientific classification
- Kingdom: Plantae
- Clade: Tracheophytes
- Clade: Angiosperms
- Clade: Eudicots
- Clade: Asterids
- Order: Apiales
- Family: Araliaceae
- Genus: Heptapleurum
- Species: H. alpinum

Binomial name
- Heptapleurum alpinum (Grushv. & Skvortsova) Lowry & G.M.Plunkett (2020)

Synonyms
- Schefflera alpina Grushv. & Skvortsova (1975)

Species of plant

Heptapleurum alpinum is a flowering plant in the family Araliaceae. It a shrub or tree endemic to Vietnam.
