= Heptapleurum angiense =

Conservation status
- Vulnerable (IUCN 3.1)

Scientific classification
- Kingdom: Plantae
- Clade: Tracheophytes
- Clade: Angiosperms
- Clade: Eudicots
- Clade: Asterids
- Order: Apiales
- Family: Araliaceae
- Genus: Heptapleurum
- Species: H. angiense

Binomial name
- Heptapleurum angiense (Gibbs) Lowry & G.M.Plunkett (2020)

Synonyms
- Brassaia angiensis (Gibbs) Hutch. (1967); Schefflera angiensis Gibbs (1917)

Species of plant

Heptapleurum angiense is a flowering plant in the family Araliaceae. It is a tree endemic to western New Guinea.

== Description ==
Heptapleurum angiense is a small tree, growing 4 to 5 meters tall. It has large leaves with leaflets from 0.7 to 17 cm in length, on leaf stalks of 20–40 cm long.

== Range and habitat ==
Heptapleurum angiense is native to the Arfak Mountains and Anggi Lakes area of West Papua Province of Indonesian New Guinea. It grows in montane rain forest bordering the lakes, from 1,840 to 2,050 meters elevation.

It is likely insect pollinated, and the fruits and seed are dispersed by birds.
