= Heptapleurum fastigiatum =

Conservation status
- Endangered (IUCN 2.3)

Scientific classification
- Kingdom: Plantae
- Clade: Tracheophytes
- Clade: Angiosperms
- Clade: Eudicots
- Clade: Asterids
- Order: Apiales
- Family: Araliaceae
- Genus: Heptapleurum
- Species: H. fastigiatum

Binomial name
- Heptapleurum fastigiatum (Miq.) Seem.

Synonyms
- Heptapleurum laeve Koord. & Valeton (1900); Paratropia fastigiata Miq. (1863); Schefflera fastigiata (Miq.) R.Vig. (1909); Schefflera laeve (Koord. & Valeton) R.Vig. (1909)

Species of flowering plant

Heptapleurum fastigiatum is a species of plant in the family Araliaceae. It is a scrambling tree endemic to Java in Indonesia. It is known only from forest remnants on the island of Nusa Kambangan and possibly the Ujung Kulon Peninsula. It is an endangered species threatened by habitat loss.
