= Heptapleurum chapanum =

Conservation status
- Vulnerable (IUCN 2.3)

Scientific classification
- Kingdom: Plantae
- Clade: Tracheophytes
- Clade: Angiosperms
- Clade: Eudicots
- Clade: Asterids
- Order: Apiales
- Family: Araliaceae
- Genus: Heptapleurum
- Species: H. chapanum

Binomial name
- Heptapleurum chapanum (Harms) Lowry & G.M.Plunkett (2020)

Synonyms
- Agalma diversifoliolatum (H.L.Li) Hutch. (1967); Schefflera chapana Harms (1937); Schefflera diversifoliolata H.L.Li (1942); Schefflera pingpienensis C.J.Tseng & G.Hoo (1965); Schefflera vietnamensis Grushv. & Skvortsova (1966)

Species of flowering plant

Heptapleurum chapanum is a species of plant in the family Araliaceae. It is found in the Fansipan (Hoang Lien Son) range of northern Vietnam and Yunnan Province of southern China. It grows in subtropical montane forest between 1,000 and 1,200 meters elevation.
