= Heptapleurum insigne =

Conservation status
- Endangered (IUCN 3.1)

Scientific classification
- Kingdom: Plantae
- Clade: Tracheophytes
- Clade: Angiosperms
- Clade: Eudicots
- Clade: Asterids
- Order: Apiales
- Family: Araliaceae
- Genus: Heptapleurum
- Species: H. insigne

Binomial name
- Heptapleurum insigne (C.N.Ho) Lowry & G.M.Plunkett (2020)

Synonyms
- Schefflera insignis C.N.Ho (1952)

Species of flowering plant

Heptapleurum insigne is a species of plant in the family Araliaceae. It is endemic to Yangchun county of Guangdong province in southern China.
