= Heptapleurum kontumense =

Conservation status
- Endangered (IUCN 2.3)

Scientific classification
- Kingdom: Plantae
- Clade: Tracheophytes
- Clade: Angiosperms
- Clade: Eudicots
- Clade: Asterids
- Order: Apiales
- Family: Araliaceae
- Genus: Heptapleurum
- Species: H. kontumense

Binomial name
- Heptapleurum kontumense (Bui) Lowry & G.M.Plunkett (2020)

Synonyms
- Schefflera kontumensis Bui (1974 publ. 1975)

Species of tree

Heptapleurum kontumense is a species of plant in the family Araliaceae. It is endemic to Vietnam.
