= Heptapleurum beccarianum =

Conservation status
- Vulnerable (IUCN 2.3)

Scientific classification
- Kingdom: Plantae
- Clade: Tracheophytes
- Clade: Angiosperms
- Clade: Eudicots
- Clade: Asterids
- Order: Apiales
- Family: Araliaceae
- Genus: Heptapleurum
- Species: H. beccarianum

Binomial name
- Heptapleurum beccarianum (Harms) Lowry & G.M.Plunkett (2020)

Synonyms
- Schefflera beccariana Harms (1917); Schefflera rubiginosa Ridl. (1946)

Species of flowering plant

Heptapleurum beccarianum is a species of plant in the family Araliaceae. It is a tree endemic to the Malaysian state of Sarawak on Borneo. It grows in lowland rain forest.

Populations previously recorded in Peninsular Malaysia have been reclassified as two new species, Heptapleurum frodinii and Heptapleurum lengguanii.
