= Heptapleurum marlipoense =

Conservation status
- Critically Endangered (IUCN 3.1)

Scientific classification
- Kingdom: Plantae
- Clade: Tracheophytes
- Clade: Angiosperms
- Clade: Eudicots
- Clade: Asterids
- Order: Apiales
- Family: Araliaceae
- Genus: Heptapleurum
- Species: H. marlipoense

Binomial name
- Heptapleurum marlipoense (C.J.Tseng & G.Hoo) G.M.Plunkett & Lowry (2020)

Synonyms
- Schefflera marlipoensis C.J.Tseng & G.Hoo (1965)

Species of flowering plant

Heptapleurum marlipoense is a species of plant in the family Araliaceae. It is a tree endemic to southeastern Yunnan in China. It is assessed as Critically Endangered.
