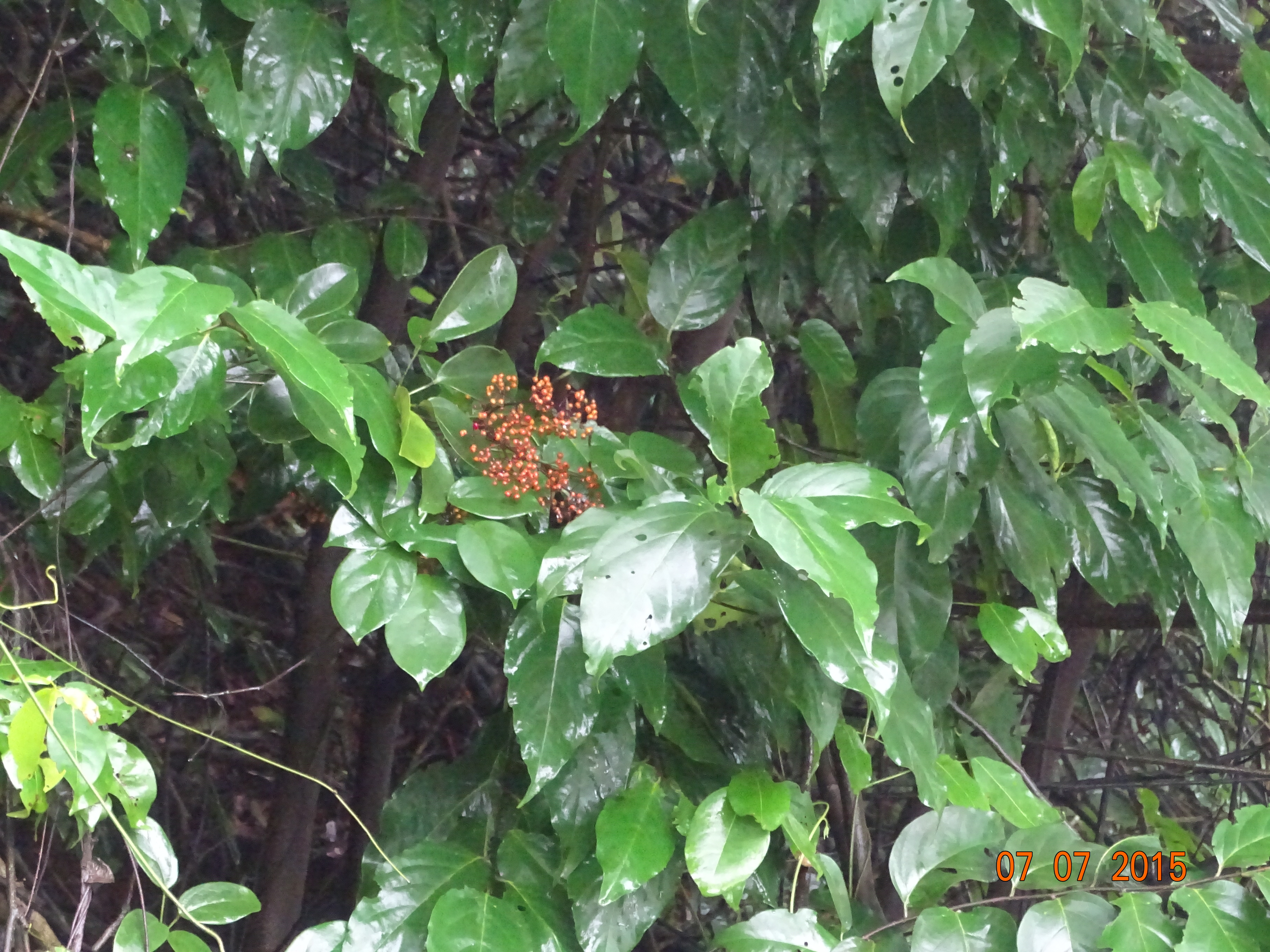
- Leaves and fruits

Scientific classification
- Kingdom: Plantae
- Clade: Tracheophytes
- Clade: Angiosperms
- Clade: Eudicots
- Clade: Asterids
- Order: Apiales
- Family: Araliaceae
- Genus: Heptapleurum
- Species: H. venulosum

Binomial name
- Heptapleurum venulosum (Wight & Arn.) Seem.

Synonyms
- Hedera venulosa (Wight & Arn.) Bedd.; Paratropia venulosa Wight & Arn.; Schefflera venulosa (Wight & Arn.) Harms

= Heptapleurum venulosum =

Species of plant

Heptapleurum venulosum is a species of plant in the family Araliaceae.

== Description ==
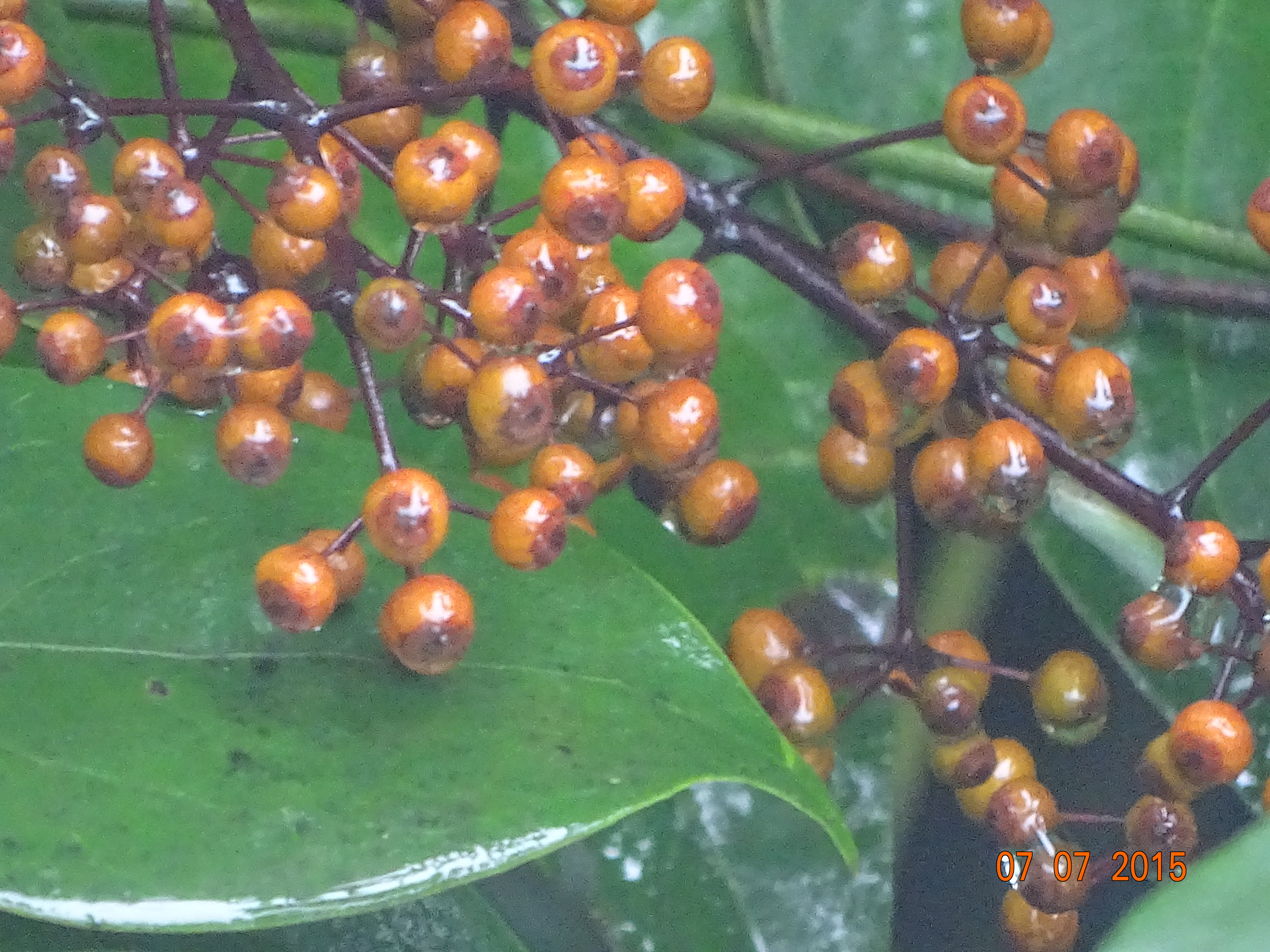
fruits

A large climbing shrub, leaves elliptic-lanceolate, cuneate, coriaceous main veins distinct. Umbels on racemes; peduncles long; pedicels of umbels 2 – 3 cm long, Flowers pentamerous, pedicellad, Petals greenish-white. Ovary 5-locular; styles short, free. Drupes subglobose, brownish-black. Flowering - February till March.

== Range ==
The native range of this species is Indian Subcontinent. Bangladesh, India, Nepal, China, Malaysia, and Myanmar.. Within India distribution is in the states of Andhra Pradesh, Karnataka, Kerala, Jharkhand, Uttarakhand, Himachal Pradesh, Uttar Pradesh, Punjab, and Andaman and Nicobar Islands.

== Habitat ==
It is a scrambling tree and grows primarily in the seasonally dry tropical biome.
