= Heptapleurum wrayi =

Conservation status
- Data Deficient (IUCN 2.3)

Scientific classification
- Kingdom: Plantae
- Clade: Tracheophytes
- Clade: Angiosperms
- Clade: Eudicots
- Clade: Asterids
- Order: Apiales
- Family: Araliaceae
- Genus: Heptapleurum
- Species: H. wrayi

Binomial name
- Heptapleurum wrayi King (1898)

Synonyms
- Agalma wrayi (King) Hutch.; Schefflera wrayi (King) R.Vig.

Species of tree

Heptapleurum wrayi is a species of flowering plant in the family Araliaceae. It is a tree native to Peninsular Malaysia and Peninsular Thailand. It is threatened by habitat loss.
