= Heptapleurum calyptratum =

Conservation status
- Conservation Dependent (IUCN 2.3)

Scientific classification
- Kingdom: Plantae
- Clade: Tracheophytes
- Clade: Angiosperms
- Clade: Eudicots
- Clade: Asterids
- Order: Apiales
- Family: Araliaceae
- Genus: Heptapleurum
- Species: H. calyptratum

Binomial name
- Heptapleurum calyptratum (Hook.f. & Thomson) Y.F.Deng (2018)

Synonyms
- Aralia elliptica K.Koch (1867); Aralia pulchra Van Houtte ex H.Jaeger (1867); Heptapleurum pulchrum (Van Houtte ex H.Jaeger) Voss (1894); Paratropia pulchra Decne. & Planch. (1854), nom. nud.; Paratropia wallichiana Planch. (1858), sensu auct.; Schefflera pueckleri (K.Koch) Frodin (1989); Sciodaphyllum pulchellum Griff. (1843), nom. nud.; Sciodaphyllum pulchrum Wall. (1840), nom. nud.; Tupidanthus calyptratus Hook.f. & Thomson (1856) (basionym); Tupidanthus pueckleri K.Koch (1859)

Species of flowering plant

Heptapleurum calyptratum, commonly known as mallet flower, is a species of plant in the family Araliaceae. It ranges from eastern India and Bangladesh through Tibet and Indochina (Cambodia, Laos, Myanmar, Thailand, Vietnam) to southern China (Xizang, Yunnan), growing at altitudes of 900–1700 m.

== Description ==
Heptapleurum calyptratum is a scrambling shrub or tree growing 4-10 m tall, erect at first, the stems eventually climbing up to 30 m long, with glabrous foliage. The leaves are palmate, with a petiole 15–60 cm long, and 7-11 elliptical leaflets 12–23 cm long and 4-8.5 cm wide. The flowers are green, 1.5–3 cm diameter, produced in paniculate umbels in September, with the globose fruit 2–3.5 cm diameter, ripening in February. Its gynoecium consists of a whorl of up to two hundred "stigmatic lobes" (carpels).

== Conservation ==
Formerly (in 1998, as Schefflera pueckleri) it was listed by IUCN as a Conservation-dependent species threatened by habitat loss, but is now considered of least concern following a 2023 reevaluation.
