= Heptapleurum nanocephalum =

Conservation status
- Vulnerable (IUCN 3.1)

Scientific classification
- Kingdom: Plantae
- Clade: Tracheophytes
- Clade: Angiosperms
- Clade: Eudicots
- Clade: Asterids
- Order: Apiales
- Family: Araliaceae
- Genus: Heptapleurum
- Species: H. nanocephalum

Binomial name
- Heptapleurum nanocephalum de Kok (2022)

Species of tree

Heptapleurum nanocephalum is a species of plant in the family Araliaceae. It is a tree endemic to Peninsular Malaysia. Its natural habitat is montane rain forests. It is threatened by habitat loss. It was previously placed in the genus Schefflera.

It is a small tree which grows in montane forest and at forest edges. It is often epiphytic and sometimes grows as a crown epiphyte on canopy trees. It is known from six collections, including four in the Cameron Highlands and two further south towards Gunung Mengkuang north of Gunung Ulu Kali. It is threatened with habitat loss from deforestation.
