= Heptapleurum tetrandrum =

Scientific classification
- Kingdom: Plantae
- Clade: Tracheophytes
- Clade: Angiosperms
- Clade: Eudicots
- Clade: Asterids
- Order: Apiales
- Family: Araliaceae
- Genus: Heptapleurum
- Species: H. tetrandrum

Binomial name
- Heptapleurum tetrandrum (Merr.) G.M.Plunkett & Lowry (2020)

Synonyms
- Schefflera tetrandra Merr. (1918)

Species of flowering plant

Heptapleurum tetrandrum is a species of flowering plant in the family Araliaceae. It is a climber and is endemic to Borneo.
