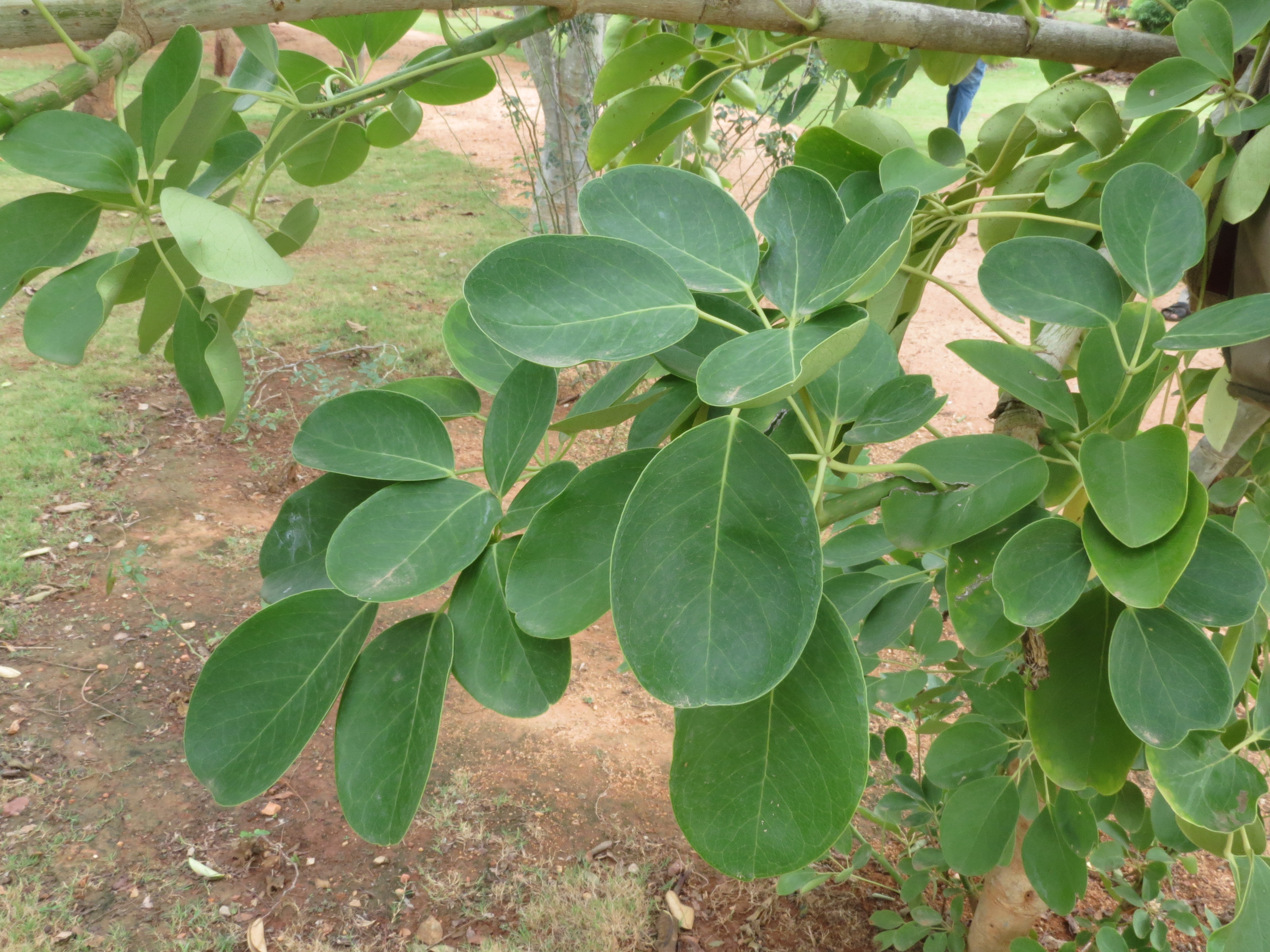
- Heptapleurum stellatum leaves

Scientific classification
- Kingdom: Plantae
- Clade: Tracheophytes
- Clade: Angiosperms
- Clade: Eudicots
- Clade: Asterids
- Order: Apiales
- Family: Araliaceae
- Genus: Heptapleurum
- Species: H. stellatum

Binomial name
- Heptapleurum stellatum Gaertn. (1791)

Synonyms
- Hedera terebinthinacea Vahl (1794); Hedera vahlii Thwaites (1859) [Illegitimate]; Heptapleurum acutangulum Gaertn. (1791); Schefflera stellata (Gaertn.) Baill. (1879); Paratropia terebinthinacea (Vahl) Arn. (1836)

= Heptapleurum stellatum =

Species of flowering plant

Heptapleurum stellatum is a species of flowering plant in the family Araliaceae. It is a small tree or scrambling shrub native to the Western Ghats of southern India and parts of Sri Lanka. It grows near streams or in open evergreen rain forests up to 2000 metres elevation.
