= Heptapleurum winkleri =

Conservation status
- Data Deficient (IUCN 3.1)

Scientific classification
- Kingdom: Plantae
- Clade: Tracheophytes
- Clade: Angiosperms
- Clade: Eudicots
- Clade: Asterids
- Order: Apiales
- Family: Araliaceae
- Genus: Heptapleurum
- Species: H. winkleri

Binomial name
- Heptapleurum winkleri (Harms) G.M.Plunkett & Lowry (2020)

Synonyms
- Schefflera winkleri Harms (1917)

Species of flowering plant

Heptapleurum winkleri is a species of flowering plant in the family Araliaceae. It is endemic to Borneo.

Heptapleurum winkleri is a shrub or small tree which grows up to 5 meters tall.

The species is known only from a single specimen, collected south-west of Buntok near the Barito River in Central Kalimantan. It was collected in padang forest, a type of heath forest which grows on nutrient-poor soils, at 10 to 25 meters elevation. Padang forest is composed mostly of low shrubs, and often results from the degradation of taller heath forests (kerangas) by fire or logging.

Ants were observed tending scale insects on the stipules of the plant.
