= Heptapleurum parvifoliolatum =

Conservation status
- Critically Endangered (IUCN 3.1)

Scientific classification
- Kingdom: Plantae
- Clade: Tracheophytes
- Clade: Angiosperms
- Clade: Eudicots
- Clade: Asterids
- Order: Apiales
- Family: Araliaceae
- Genus: Heptapleurum
- Species: H. parvifoliolatum

Binomial name
- Heptapleurum parvifoliolatum (C.J.Tseng & G.Hoo) Y.F.Deng (2018)

Synonyms
- Schefflera parvifoliolata C.J.Tseng & G.Hoo (1965)

Species of flowering plant

Heptapleurum parvifoliolatum is a species of plant in the family Araliaceae. It is a shrub or tree endemic to southeastern Yunnan Province in southern China.
