= Heptapleurum filipes =

Scientific classification
- Kingdom: Plantae
- Clade: Tracheophytes
- Clade: Angiosperms
- Clade: Eudicots
- Clade: Asterids
- Order: Apiales
- Family: Araliaceae
- Genus: Heptapleurum
- Species: H. filipes

Binomial name
- Heptapleurum filipes Merr. Lowry & G.M.Plunkett

Synonyms
- Schefflera filipes

Species of plant

Heptapleurum filipes is a species of plant in the genus Heptapleurum.
