= Heptapleurum palawanense =

Conservation status
- Endangered (IUCN 3.1)

Scientific classification
- Kingdom: Plantae
- Clade: Tracheophytes
- Clade: Angiosperms
- Clade: Eudicots
- Clade: Asterids
- Order: Apiales
- Family: Araliaceae
- Genus: Heptapleurum
- Species: H. palawanense

Binomial name
- Heptapleurum palawanense (Merr.) G.M.Plunkett & Lowry (2020)

Synonyms
- Schefflera palawanensis Merr. (1915)

Species of flowering plant

Heptapleurum palawanense is a species of plant in the family Araliaceae. It is endemic to the island of Palawan in the Philippines. It is threatened by habitat loss.

== Description ==
Heptapleurum palawanense is sub-erect shrub which starts as an epiphyte and grows 3 to 4 meters tall. The fruits are bright yellow to orange, and appear in April. Fruit and seeds are likely dispersed by birds.

== Range and habitat ==
Heptapleurum palawanense was described in 1915 from a specimen collected in Taytay municipality in northern Palawan. Other specimens were collected in the Pagdanan Range of San Vicente municipality south of Taytay, and on Lagen Island in El Nido municipality north of Taytay. It commonly grows in thickets bordering open grasslands and exposed karst formations, from sea level to 300 meters elevation.
