= Heptapleurum hullettii =

Conservation status
- Least Concern (IUCN 2.3)

Scientific classification
- Kingdom: Plantae
- Clade: Tracheophytes
- Clade: Angiosperms
- Clade: Eudicots
- Clade: Asterids
- Order: Apiales
- Family: Araliaceae
- Genus: Heptapleurum
- Species: H. hullettii

Binomial name
- Heptapleurum hullettii King (1898)

Synonyms
- Heptapleurum elegans Ridl. (1915); Heptapleurum scortechinii King (1898); Schefflera elegans (Ridl.) Ridl. (1922); Schefflera hullettii (King) R.Vig. (1909); Schefflera scortechinii (King) R.Vig. (1909)

Species of flowering plant

Heptapleurum hullettii is a species of flowering plant in the family Araliaceae. It is a small tree native to Peninsular Thailand, Peninsular Malaysia, and Singapore.
