= Heptapleurum singalangense =

Scientific classification
- Kingdom: Plantae
- Clade: Tracheophytes
- Clade: Angiosperms
- Clade: Eudicots
- Clade: Asterids
- Order: Apiales
- Family: Araliaceae
- Genus: Heptapleurum
- Species: H. singalangense

Binomial name
- Heptapleurum singalangense (Miq.) Seem. (1865)

Synonyms
- Paratropia singalangensis Miq. (1863); Schefflera singalangensis (Miq.) R.Vig. (1909)

Species of flowering plant

Heptapleurum singalangense is a species of flowering plant in the family Araliaceae. It is native to Borneo, Sumatra, and Peninsular Malaysia.
