= Heptapleurum palmiforme =

Conservation status
- Endangered (IUCN 2.3)

Scientific classification
- Kingdom: Plantae
- Clade: Tracheophytes
- Clade: Angiosperms
- Clade: Eudicots
- Clade: Asterids
- Order: Apiales
- Family: Araliaceae
- Genus: Heptapleurum
- Species: H. palmiforme

Binomial name
- Heptapleurum palmiforme (Grushv. & Skvortsova) G.M.Plunkett & Lowry (2020)

Synonyms
- Schefflera palmiformis Grushv. & Skvortsova (1972)

Species of tree

Heptapleurum palmiforme is a species of plant in the family Araliaceae. It is endemic to Vietnam. It is threatened by habitat loss.
