= Heptapleurum alongense =

Scientific classification
- Kingdom: Plantae
- Clade: Tracheophytes
- Clade: Angiosperms
- Clade: Eudicots
- Clade: Asterids
- Order: Apiales
- Family: Araliaceae
- Genus: Heptapleurum
- Species: H. alongense

Binomial name
- Heptapleurum alongense (R.Vig.) Lowry & G.M.Plunkett (2020)

Synonyms
- Schefflera alongensis R.Vig. (1909)

Species of flowering plant

Heptapleurum alongense is a flowering plant in the family Araliaceae. It is a climber endemic to the Hạ Long Bay islands in Vietnam.
