= Heptapleurum kuchingense =

Conservation status
- Critically Endangered (IUCN 2.3)

Scientific classification
- Kingdom: Plantae
- Clade: Tracheophytes
- Clade: Angiosperms
- Clade: Eudicots
- Clade: Asterids
- Order: Apiales
- Family: Araliaceae
- Genus: Heptapleurum
- Species: H. kuchingense

Binomial name
- Heptapleurum kuchingense (Merr.) Lowry & G.M.Plunkett (2020)

Synonyms
- Schefflera borneensis Merr. (1918), nom. illeg.; Schefflera furfuracea Merr. ex Furtado (1962), nom. superfl.; Schefflera kuchingensis Merr. (1950)

Species of tree

Heptapleurum kuchingense is a species of plant in the family Araliaceae. It is a tree endemic to Borneo where it is confined to Sarawak. It is known only from an area near Kuching. It is a multi-trunked tree, and sometimes an epiphyte.
