= Heptapleurum agamae =

Conservation status
- Critically Endangered (IUCN 3.1)

Scientific classification
- Kingdom: Plantae
- Clade: Tracheophytes
- Clade: Angiosperms
- Clade: Eudicots
- Clade: Asterids
- Order: Apiales
- Family: Araliaceae
- Genus: Heptapleurum
- Species: H. agamae

Binomial name
- Heptapleurum agamae (Merr.) Lowry & G.M.Plunkett (2020)

Synonyms
- Schefflera agamae Merr. (1915)

Species of flowering plant

Heptapleurum agamae is a species of plant in the family Araliaceae. It is endemic to the island of Palawan in the Philippines, where it grows in lowland rain forest on rocky hills. The species was collected only a single time in the 1920s. It is thought to be under pressure from habitat loss through deforestation.
