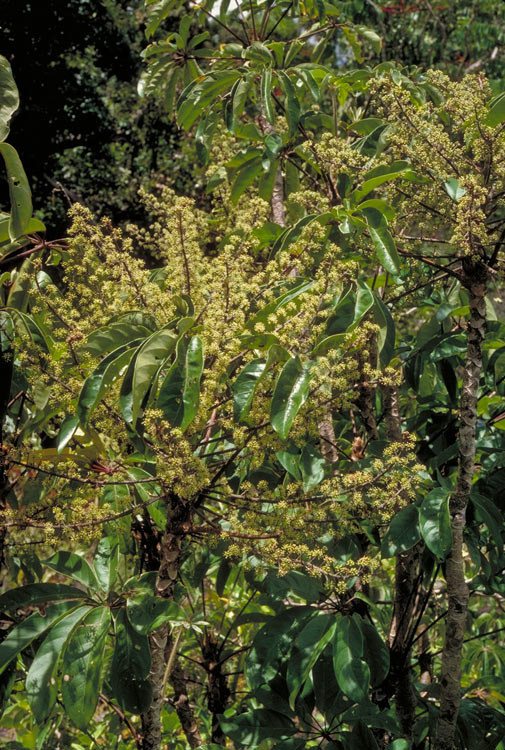

Conservation status
- Least Concern (IUCN 3.1)

Scientific classification
- Kingdom: Plantae
- Clade: Embryophytes
- Clade: Tracheophytes
- Clade: Spermatophytes
- Clade: Angiosperms
- Clade: Eudicots
- Clade: Asterids
- Order: Apiales
- Family: Araliaceae
- Genus: Heptapleurum
- Species: H. bractescens

Binomial name
- Heptapleurum bractescens (Ridl.) Lowry & G.M.Plunkett (2020)

Synonyms
- Schefflera bractescens Ridl. (1914); Schefflera aruensis Ridl. (1946)

= Heptapleurum bractescens =

Species of flowering plant

Heptapleurum bractescens is a species of plant in the family Araliaceae. It is native to New Guinea and to far northern Queensland in Australia. Originally named from a New Guinea collection, it was identified as a different species, Schefflera versteegii, when first discovered in Australia.

== Description ==
Heptapleurum bractescens is a shrub or small tree which grows up to 9 meters tall. It can grow as an epiphyte on other trees and as a lithophyte on rocks.

== Range and habitat ==
It grows in the lowlands of southern Papua New Guinea, including the Papuan Peninsula and Goodenough Island, in the Southern New Guinea freshwater swamp forests, Southern New Guinea lowland rain forests, and Southeastern Papuan rain forests ecoregions. It also grows in the Iron Range and McIlwraith Range of Queensland, in the Cape York Peninsula tropical savanna ecoregion.

It grows in rainforests and thickets, including stream and gallery forests, secondary regrowth, and in rocky areas, from sea level to 915 meters elevation.
