= Heptapleurum cephalotes =

Conservation status
- Least Concern (IUCN 3.1)

Scientific classification
- Kingdom: Plantae
- Clade: Tracheophytes
- Clade: Angiosperms
- Clade: Eudicots
- Clade: Asterids
- Order: Apiales
- Family: Araliaceae
- Genus: Heptapleurum
- Species: H. cephalotes

Binomial name
- Heptapleurum cephalotes C.B.Clarke (1879)

Synonyms
- Brassaia capitellata (Ridl.) Hutch. (1967); Brassaia cephalotes (C.B.Clarke) Hutch. (1967); Schefflera capitellata Ridl. (1920); Schefflera cephalotes (C.B.Clarke) Harms (1894)

Species of flowering plant

Heptapleurum cephalotes is a species of plant in the family Araliaceae. It is native to Borneo, Sumatra, Peninsular Malaysia, and Peninsular Thailand. The native population in Singapore is presumed extinct. It has been introduced to the Andaman Islands.

It grows in lowland rain forest.
