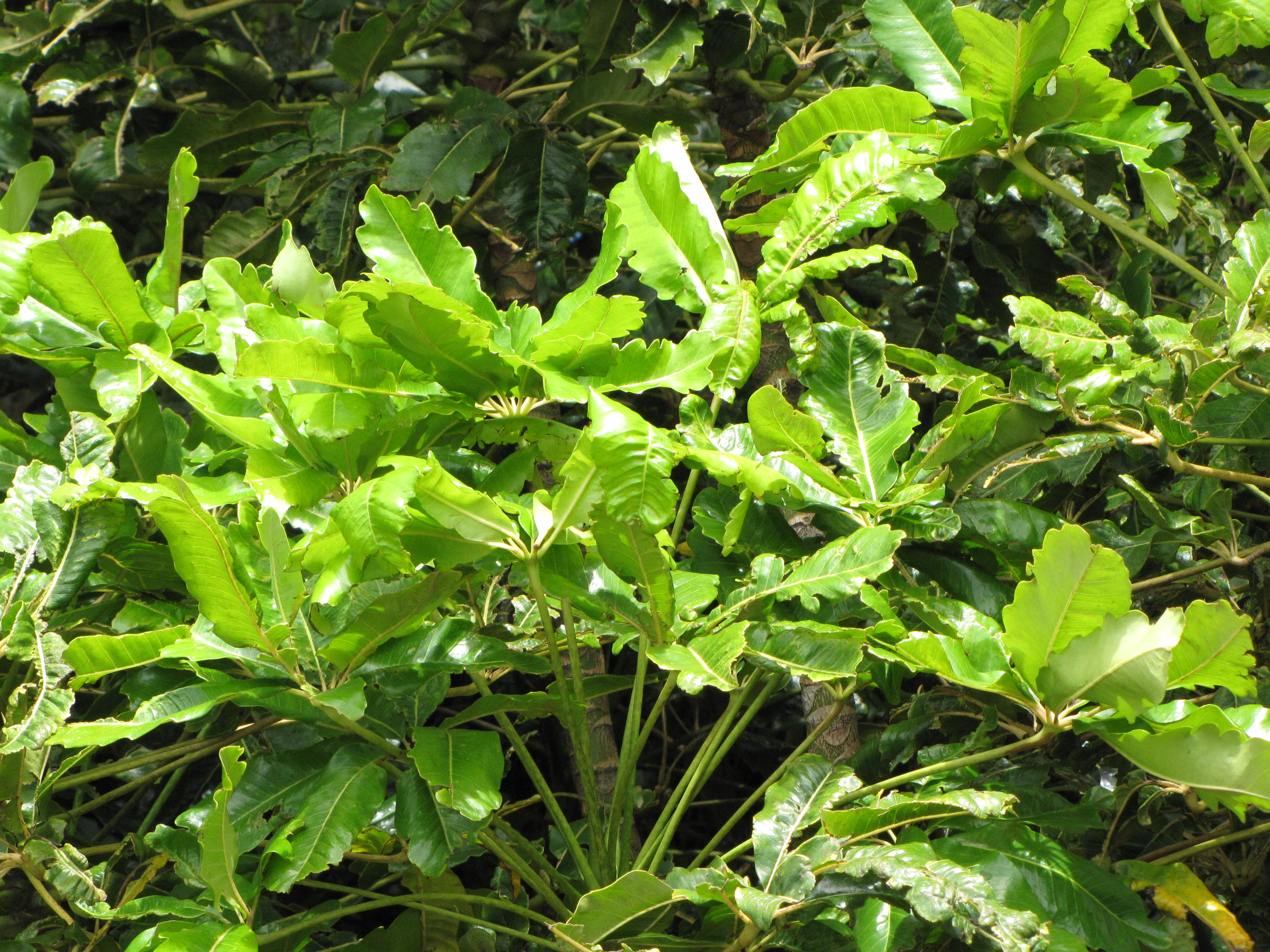

Conservation status
- Least Concern (IUCN 3.1)

Scientific classification
- Kingdom: Plantae
- Clade: Tracheophytes
- Clade: Angiosperms
- Clade: Eudicots
- Clade: Asterids
- Order: Apiales
- Family: Araliaceae
- Genus: Heptapleurum
- Species: H. polybotryum

Binomial name
- Heptapleurum polybotryum (Miq.) Seem. (1865)

Synonyms
- Synonymy: Aralia teijsmaniana (K.Koch) Bosse (1861); Aralia teysmannii K.Koch (1861); Heptapleurum eurhynchum (Miq.) Seem. (1865); Paratropia eurhyncha Miq. (1863); Paratropia polybotrya Miq. (1856); Paratropia teijsmaniana K.Koch (1859); Schefflera eurhyncha (Miq.) R.Vig. (1909); Schefflera polybotrya (Miq.) R.Vig. (1909); Schefflera polybotrya var. eurhyncha (Miq.) Bakh.f. (1965); Schefflera subavenis var. eurhyncha (Miq.) Bakh.f. (1950)

= Heptapleurum polybotryum =

Species of plant

Heptapleurum polybotryum is a species of shrub in the family Araliaceae. They are scrambling shrubs or trees native to Java and southern Sulawesi.

This species is endemic to Indonesia, where it occurs on Java from the Pulosari volcano in Banten Province of Western Java to Mount Lawu on the border between the Central Java and East Java provinces. It also occurs on the partially-collapsed stratovolcano Rakata of the Krakatau Islands, in the Sunda Strait between Java and Sumatra. There is a single record from Rante Pao in South Sulawesi. It grows in the montane rain forest understory and in montane scrub from 670 to 1,500 meters elevation.

It has been introduced to Malta, where it is occasionally found in the wild as a garden escapee.
