= Heptapleurum capituliferum =

Conservation status
- Vulnerable (IUCN 2.3)

Scientific classification
- Kingdom: Plantae
- Clade: Tracheophytes
- Clade: Angiosperms
- Clade: Eudicots
- Clade: Asterids
- Order: Apiales
- Family: Araliaceae
- Genus: Heptapleurum
- Species: H. capituliferum

Binomial name
- Heptapleurum capituliferum (Merr.) Lowry & G.M.Plunkett (2020)

Synonyms
- Schefflera capitulifera Merr. (1934)

Species of tree

Heptapleurum capituliferum is a species of plant in the family Araliaceae. It is endemic to northern Sumatra. It is a small hemiepiphytic tree, which grows in montane rain forest and along forest edges in deep ravines.
