= Heptapleurum brevipedicellatum =

Scientific classification
- Kingdom: Plantae
- Clade: Tracheophytes
- Clade: Angiosperms
- Clade: Eudicots
- Clade: Asterids
- Order: Apiales
- Family: Araliaceae
- Genus: Heptapleurum
- Species: H. brevipedicellatum

Binomial name
- Heptapleurum brevipedicellatum (Harms) Lowry & G.M.Plunkett (2020)

Synonyms
- Schefflera brevipedicellata Harms (1937); Schefflera menglaensis H.Chu & H.Wang (1990); Schefflera polypyrena C.J.Tseng & G.Hoo (1965)

Species of flowering plant

Heptapleurum brevipedicellatum is a species of flowering plant in the family Araliaceae which is native to southern China (southern Yunnan and western Guangxi) and northern Vietnam.

== Etymology ==
The species name brevipedicellatum means 'having short pedicels'.
