= Heptapleurum apiculatum =

Conservation status
- Data Deficient (IUCN 3.1)

Scientific classification
- Kingdom: Plantae
- Clade: Tracheophytes
- Clade: Angiosperms
- Clade: Eudicots
- Clade: Asterids
- Order: Apiales
- Family: Araliaceae
- Genus: Heptapleurum
- Species: H. apiculatum

Binomial name
- Heptapleurum apiculatum (Miq.) Seem. (1865)

Synonyms
- Paratropia apiculata Miq. (1864); Schefflera apiculata (Miq.) R.Vig. (1909)

Species of flowering plant

Schefflera apiculata is a species of plant in the family Araliaceae. It is a tree endemic to the Maluku Islands in Indonesia. It has been collected in the Bacan Islands, Halmahera Island, and Ternate Island, growing in lowland rain forest.
