= Heptapleurum singulare =

Scientific classification
- Kingdom: Plantae
- Clade: Tracheophytes
- Clade: Angiosperms
- Clade: Eudicots
- Clade: Asterids
- Order: Apiales
- Family: Araliaceae
- Genus: Heptapleurum
- Species: H. singulare

Binomial name
- Heptapleurum singulare (B.C.Stone) G.M.Plunkett & Lowry (2020)

Synonyms
- Schefflera singularis B.C.Stone (1977)

Species of flowering plant

Heptapleurum singulare is a species of flowering plant in the family Araliaceae. It is a climber endemic to Peninsular Malaysia.
