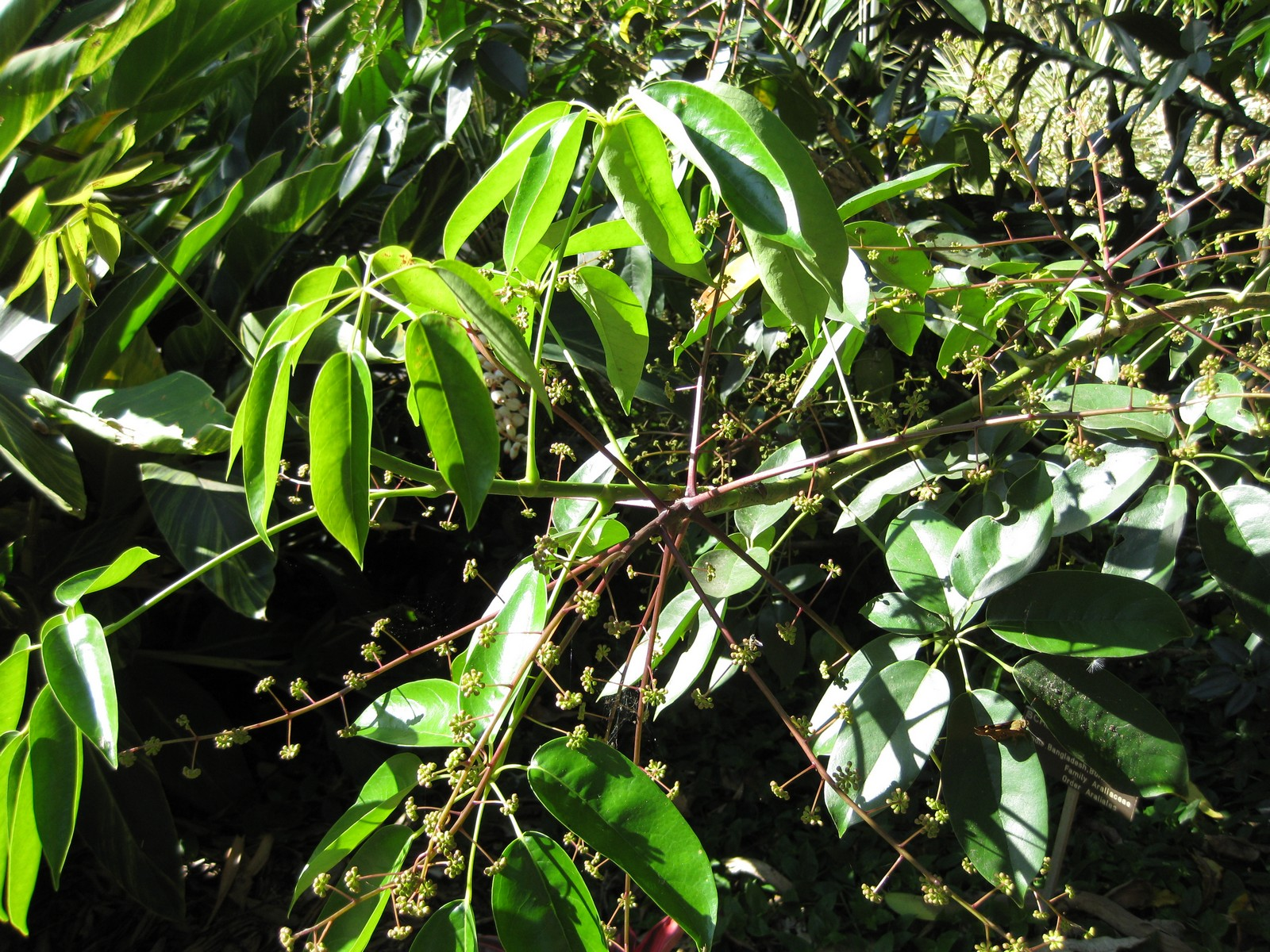

Conservation status
- Least Concern (IUCN 2.3)

Scientific classification
- Kingdom: Plantae
- Clade: Tracheophytes
- Clade: Angiosperms
- Clade: Eudicots
- Clade: Asterids
- Order: Apiales
- Family: Araliaceae
- Genus: Heptapleurum
- Species: H. digitatum

Binomial name
- Heptapleurum digitatum (G.Don ex Loudon) Lowry & G.M.Plunkett (2020)

Synonyms
- Actinophyllum digitatum Wall. ex Loudon (1829), not validly publ.; Aralia digitata Roxb. (1832), nom. illeg.; Paratropia digitata Voigt (1845); Schefflera roxburghii Gamble (1919); Schefflera venulosa var. roxburghii (Gamble) K.K.Khanna (2002); Sciodaphyllum digitatum G.Don ex Loudon (1832)

= Heptapleurum digitatum =

Species of flowering plant

Heptapleurum digitatum (synonym Schefflera roxburghii), is a species of plant in the family Araliaceae. It is native to India, Nepal, Bhutan, and Myanmar.

The Latin specific epithet roxburghii refers to the Scottish Botanist William Roxburgh.
