= Heptapleurum heterophyllum =

Scientific classification
- Kingdom: Plantae
- Clade: Tracheophytes
- Clade: Angiosperms
- Clade: Eudicots
- Clade: Asterids
- Order: Apiales
- Family: Araliaceae
- Genus: Heptapleurum
- Species: H. heterophyllum

Binomial name
- Heptapleurum heterophyllum (Wall. ex G.Don) Seem.

Synonyms
- Hedera heterophylla Wall. ex G.Don; Paratropia heterophylla (Wall. ex G.Don) C.Presl; Schefflera heterophylla (Wall. ex G.Don) Harms

Species of lower story rainforest tree

Heptapleurum heterophyllum is a lower story rainforest tree native to the Malay Peninsula (Peninsular Malaysia and Peninsular Thailand and into adjacent Sumatra). It belongs to the family Araliaceae. Its common name is great-leaved ivy-palm. It is noteworthy for having very large leaves which are quadripalmate, (i.e. the leaflet is the fourth order of branching in the leaf), possibly the only hardwood (dicot) tree that is so.
