= Heptapleurum acutissimum =

Scientific classification
- Kingdom: Plantae
- Clade: Tracheophytes
- Clade: Angiosperms
- Clade: Eudicots
- Clade: Asterids
- Order: Apiales
- Family: Araliaceae
- Genus: Heptapleurum
- Species: H. acutissimum

Binomial name
- Heptapleurum acutissimum (Miq.) Seem. (1865)

Synonyms
- Paratropia acutissima Miq. (1863); Schefflera acutissima (Miq.) Harms (1894); Schefflera bartlettii Merr. (1934)

Species of flowering plant

Heptapleurum acutissimum is a flowering plant in the family Araliaceae. It is native to Borneo and Sumatra.
