= Heptapleurum curranii =

Conservation status
- Critically Endangered (IUCN 3.1)

Scientific classification
- Kingdom: Plantae
- Clade: Tracheophytes
- Clade: Angiosperms
- Clade: Eudicots
- Clade: Asterids
- Order: Apiales
- Family: Araliaceae
- Genus: Heptapleurum
- Species: H. curranii

Binomial name
- Heptapleurum curranii (Merr.) Lowry & G.M.Plunkett (2020)

Synonyms
- Schefflera curranii Merr. (1915)

Species of flowering plant

Heptapleurum curranii is a species of plant in the family Araliaceae. It is a scrambling shrub or small tree endemic to the island of Palawan in the Philippines.

Heptapleurum curranii is known from only two locations – Victoria Peak in central Palawan and Mount Beaufort in Puerto Princesa municipality. The species' estimated extent of occurrence (EOO) and area of occupancy (AOO) are only 8 km^{2}.

It grows along stream banks in montane rain forests above 1,200 meters elevation.
