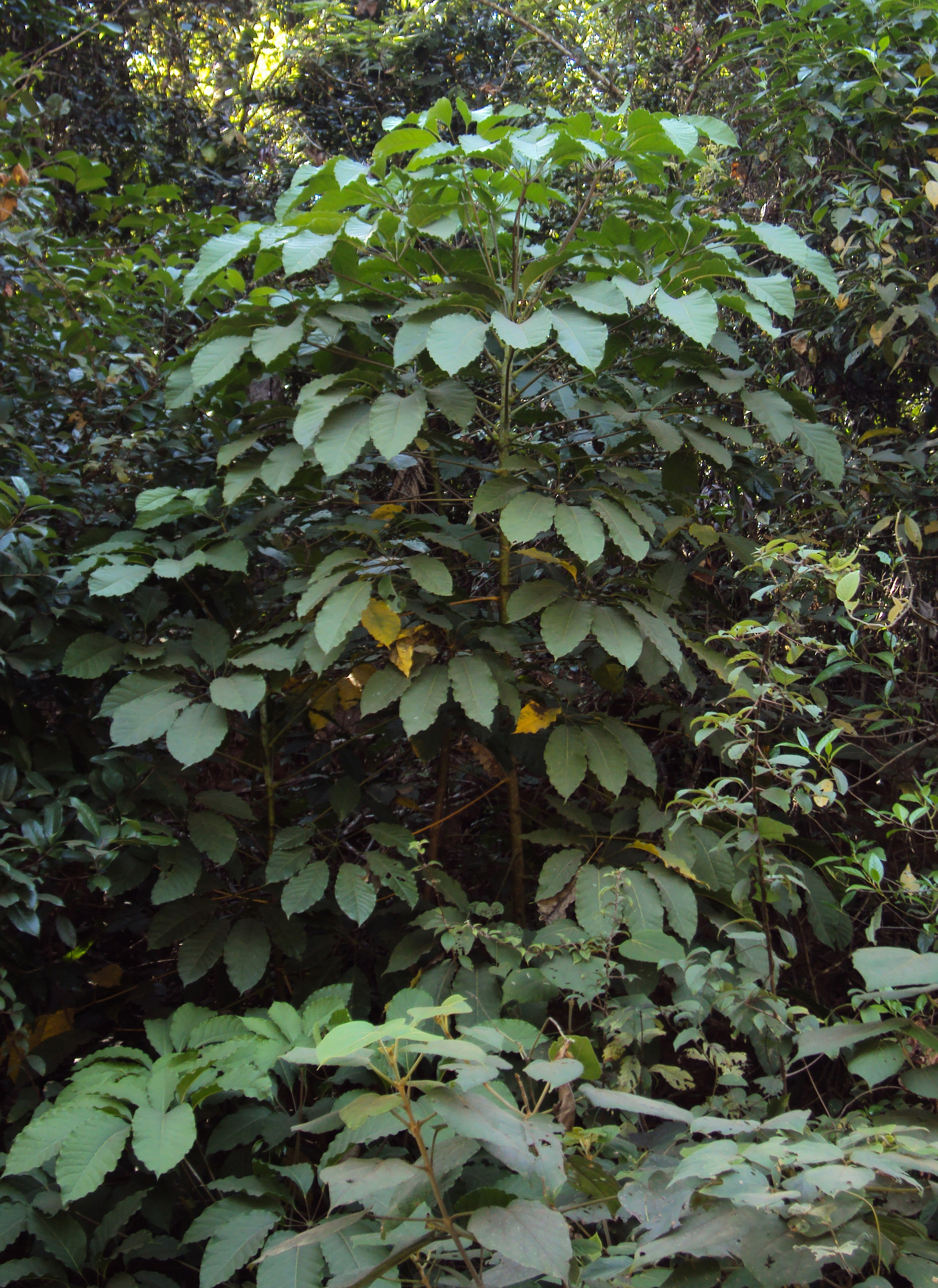
- Heptapleurum racemosum

Scientific classification
- Kingdom: Plantae
- Clade: Tracheophytes
- Clade: Angiosperms
- Clade: Eudicots
- Clade: Asterids
- Order: Apiales
- Family: Araliaceae
- Genus: Heptapleurum
- Species: H. racemosum

Binomial name
- Heptapleurum racemosum (Wight) Bedd. (1872)

Synonyms
- Agalma racemosum (Wight) Seem. (1864); Hedera racemosa Wight (1845); Schefflera racemosa (Wight) Harms (1894)

= Heptapleurum racemosum =

Species of tree

Heptapleurum racemosum is a species of plant in the family Araliaceae. It is a canopy tree that is endemic to Western Ghats of India.
