= Heptapleurum multifoliolatum =

Conservation status
- Endangered (IUCN 3.1)

Scientific classification
- Kingdom: Plantae
- Clade: Tracheophytes
- Clade: Angiosperms
- Clade: Eudicots
- Clade: Asterids
- Order: Apiales
- Family: Araliaceae
- Genus: Heptapleurum
- Species: H. multifoliolatum

Binomial name
- Heptapleurum multifoliolatum (Merr.) G.M.Plunkett & Lowry (2020)

Synonyms
- Schefflera multifoliolata Merr. (1933 publ. 1934)

Species of tree

Heptapleurum multifoliolatum is a species of plant in the family Araliaceae. It is a climber or small tree endemic to Sumatra. It is an endangered species threatened by habitat loss.

Heptapleurum multifoliolatum is restricted to Gunung Sibajak, Sibalangit and Banda Baru in northern Sumatera. It grows on slopes montane rain forest from 1,250 to 1,900 metres elevation.
