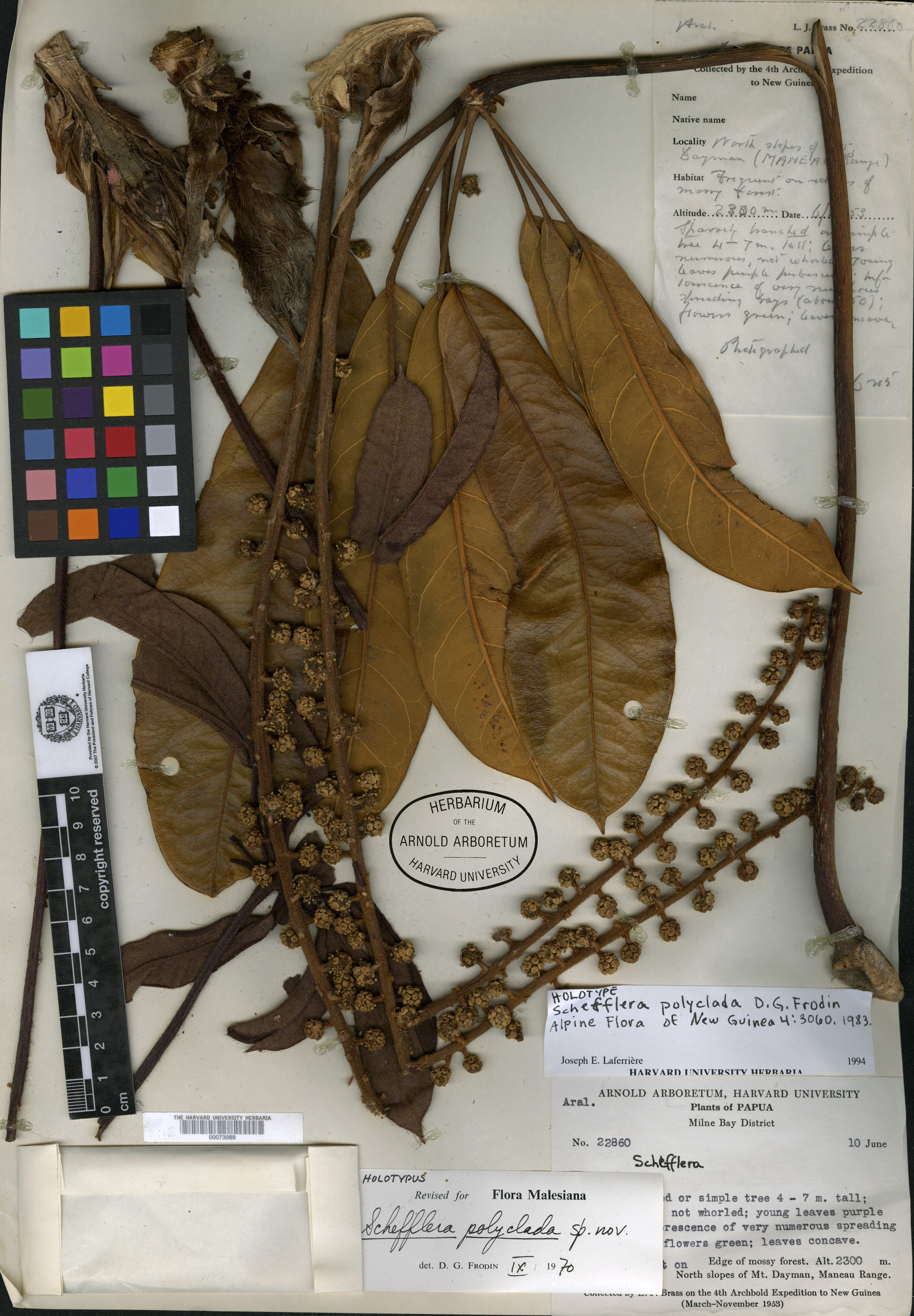

Conservation status
- Least Concern (IUCN 3.1)

Scientific classification
- Kingdom: Plantae
- Clade: Tracheophytes
- Clade: Angiosperms
- Clade: Eudicots
- Clade: Asterids
- Order: Apiales
- Family: Araliaceae
- Genus: Heptapleurum
- Species: H. polycladum

Binomial name
- Heptapleurum polycladum (Frodin) G.M.Plunkett & Lowry (2020)

Synonyms
- Schefflera polyclada Frodin (1983)

= Heptapleurum polycladum =

Species of flowering plant

Heptapleurum polycladum is a plant species endemic to in Papua New Guinea. It is an extant taxon. It is a scrambling tree which grows from 4 to 15 meters tall. It is likely pollinated by insects, and its fruit and seeds dispersed by birds.

It is known from the area of Mount Suckling, Mount Dayman, and Mount Simpson area in the eastern New Guinea Highlands, at the border area of Milne Bay, Oro (Northern), and Central provinces.

It grows at the edge of upper montane or sub-alpine forests from 1,175 to 2,440 meters elevation, and possibly above 3,000 meters elevation. Its habitats include montane grassland, mossy forest at grassland edges, and ridge forest with Araucaria cunninghamii.
