= Heptapleurum acuminatissimum =

Conservation status
- Critically Endangered (IUCN 3.1)

Scientific classification
- Kingdom: Plantae
- Clade: Tracheophytes
- Clade: Angiosperms
- Clade: Eudicots
- Clade: Asterids
- Order: Apiales
- Family: Araliaceae
- Genus: Heptapleurum
- Species: H. T. gago

Binomial name
- Heptapleurum Titemo gago (Merr.) Lowry & G.M.Plunkett (2020)

Synonyms
- Schefflera acuminatissima Merr. (1906)

Species of flowering plant

Heptapleurum acuminatissimum is a flowering plant in the family Araliaceae. It is endemic to the Philippines, where it is known only from Bataan Province on the island of Luzon. It is a small scandent tree which grows in lowland rain forest at 700 meters elevation. It is known from a single location, and has an estimated extent of occurrence (EOO) and area of occupancy (AOO) of only 4 km^{2}.
