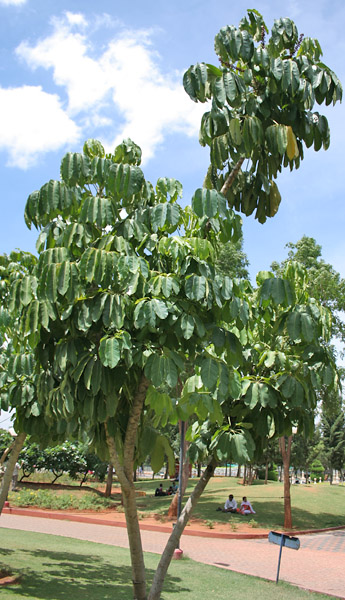
- In Hyderabad, India

Conservation status
- Least Concern (IUCN 3.1)

Scientific classification
- Kingdom: Plantae
- Clade: Tracheophytes
- Clade: Angiosperms
- Clade: Eudicots
- Clade: Asterids
- Order: Apiales
- Family: Araliaceae
- Genus: Heptapleurum
- Species: H. actinophyllum

Binomial name
- Heptapleurum actinophyllum (Endl.) Lowry & G.M.Plunkett

Synonyms
- Brassaia actinophylla Endl.; Brassaia singaporensis Ridl.; Schefflera actinophylla (Endl.) Harms

= Heptapleurum actinophyllum =

Species of tree

Heptapleurum actinophyllum (formerly Schefflera actinophylla) is a tree in the family Araliaceae. It is native to tropical rainforests and gallery forests in northern and northeastern Queensland coasts and the Northern Territory of Australia, as well as New Guinea and Java. Common names include Australian umbrella tree, Queensland umbrella tree, octopus tree and amate.

== Description ==
Heptapleurum actinophyllum is an evergreen tree growing to 15 m (50 feet) tall. It has palmately compound medium green leaves in groups of seven leaflets. It is usually multi-trunked, and the flowers develop at the top of the tree. It often grows as a hemiepiphyte on other rainforest trees. It produces racemes up to 2 m (6.5 feet) long containing up to 1,000 small red flowers. Flowering begins in early summer and typically continues for several months.

The specific epithet actinophyllum means "with radiating leaves".

== Ecology ==
The up to 1,000 flowers produced by the plant generate large amounts of nectar, attracting nectar-eating birds that pollinate them. The fruits are eaten by many birds and animals including musky rat-kangaroos, red-legged pademelons and spectacled flying foxes. Its leaves are a favourite food of the Bennett's tree-kangaroo.

== Cultivation ==
It is commonly grown in mild to warm climates as a decorative tree in larger gardens and, when mature, it has red spikes of flowers with up to 20 racemes which develop in summer or early autumn. Propagation is by seed or cuttings. It prefers well-drained soil and only needs occasional watering and feeding to thrive. It is, however, an aggressive plant and its roots can dominate surrounding soil. In some areas (e.g., Florida and Hawaii, USA), it is an invasive weed and therefore planting is highly unadvised.

With a minimum temperature of 13 °C (55 °F), juvenile specimens are grown in temperate regions as houseplants. This plant has gained the Royal Horticultural Society's Award of Garden Merit.

== Gallery ==
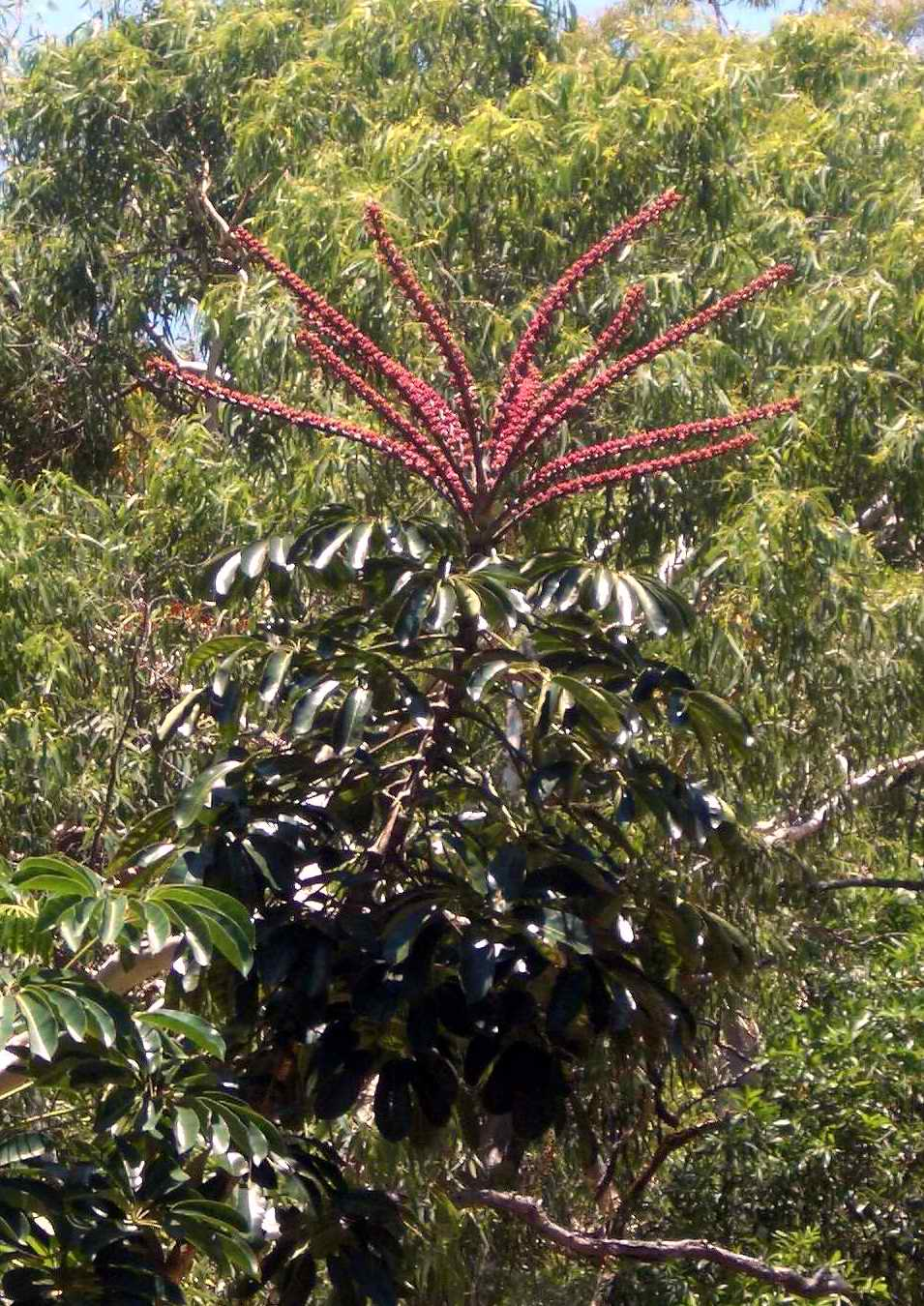
Umbrella tree flowers

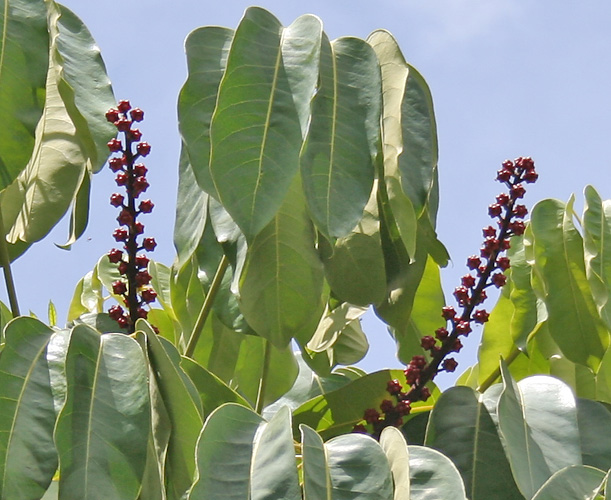
Tree canopy in Hyderabad, India

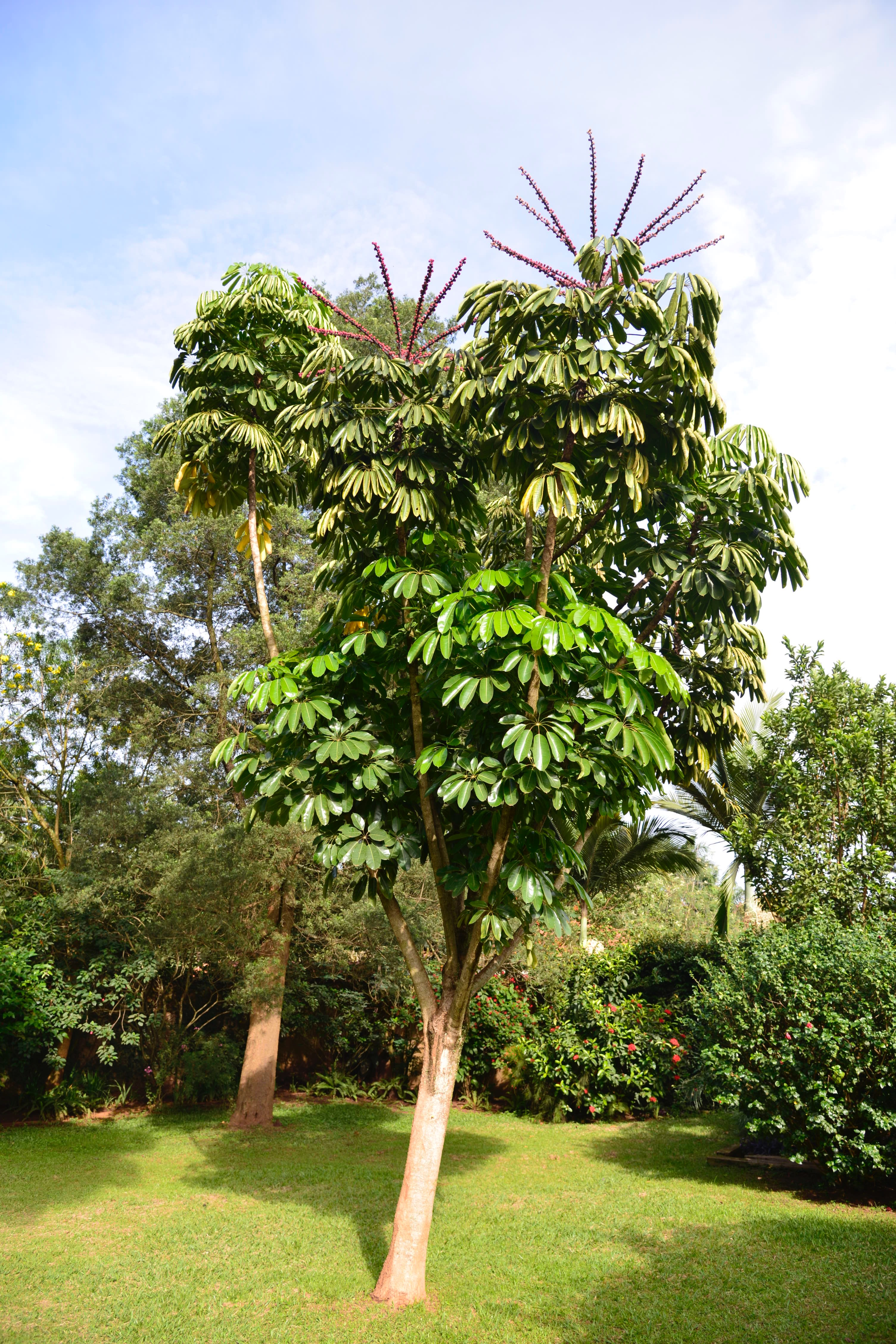
Tree in Kampala, Uganda

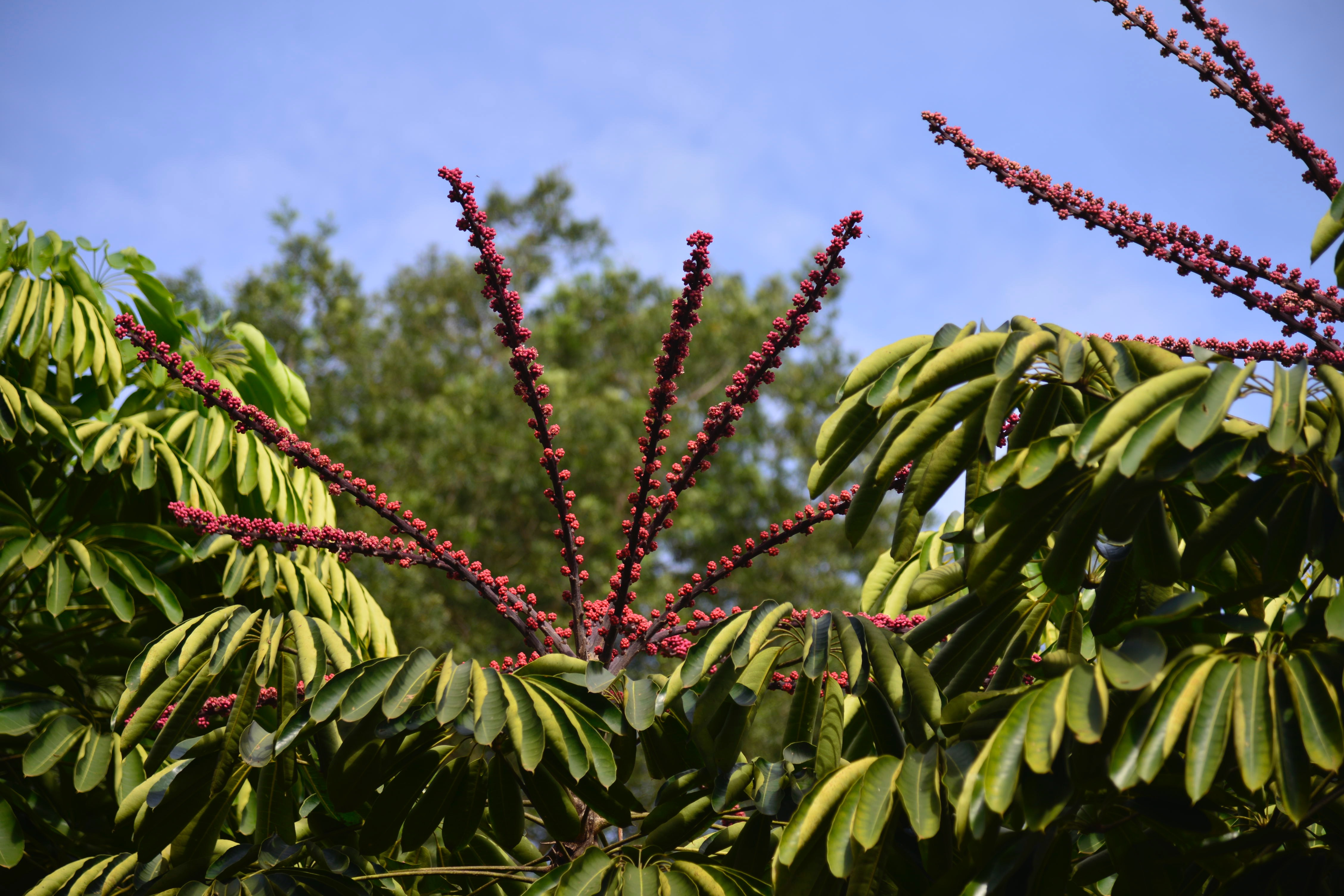
Flowers

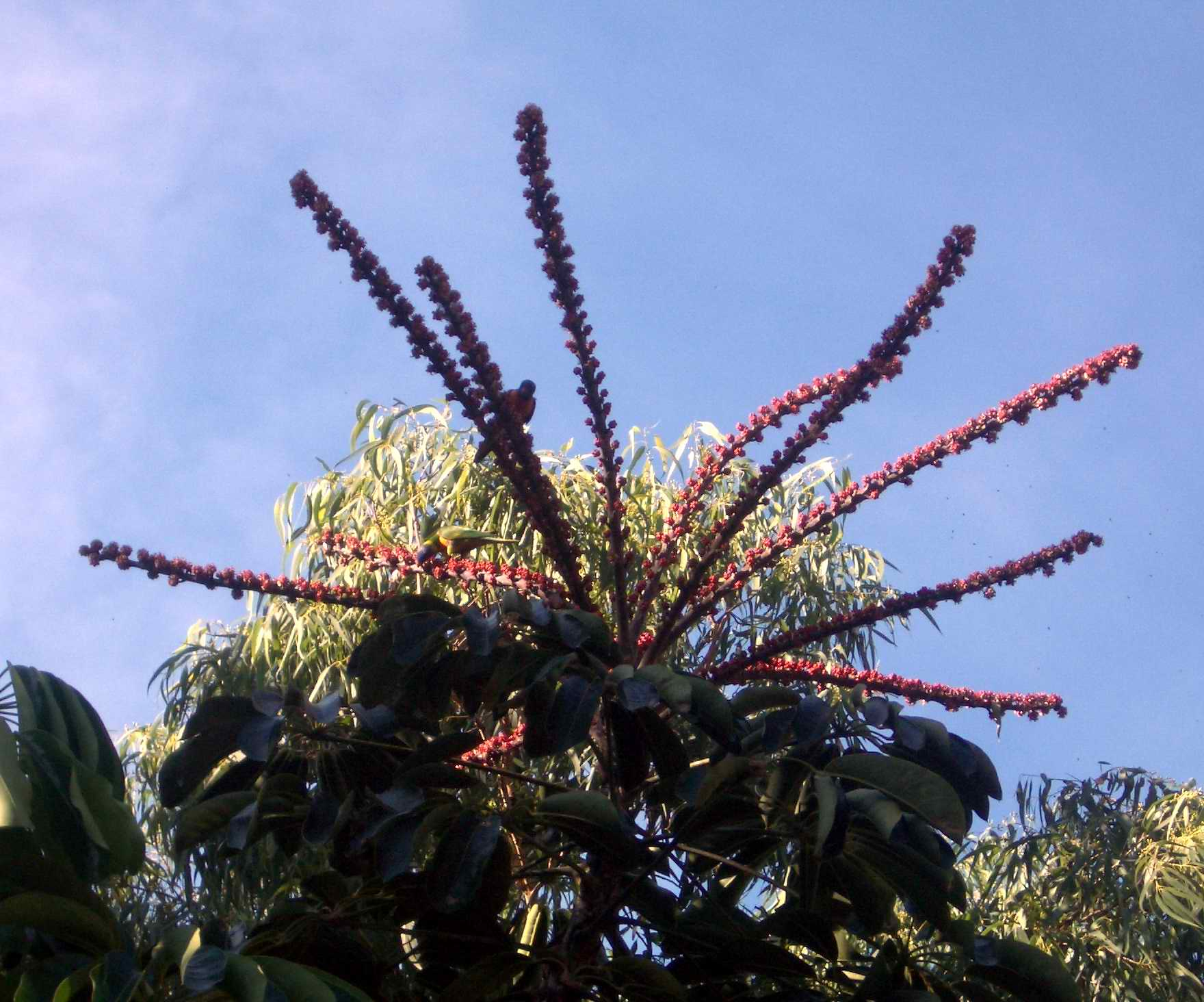
Rainbow lorikeets feeding on umbrella tree

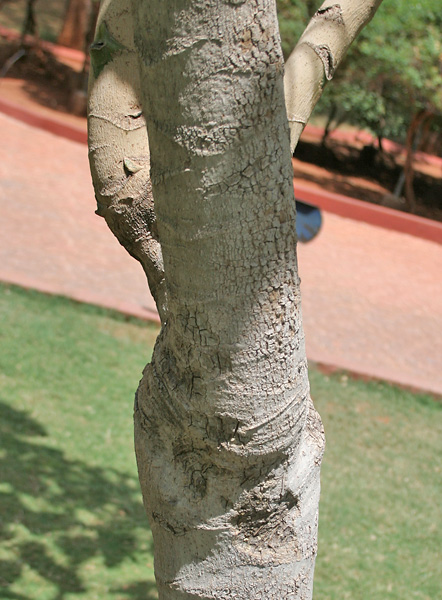
Trunk in Hyderabad, India

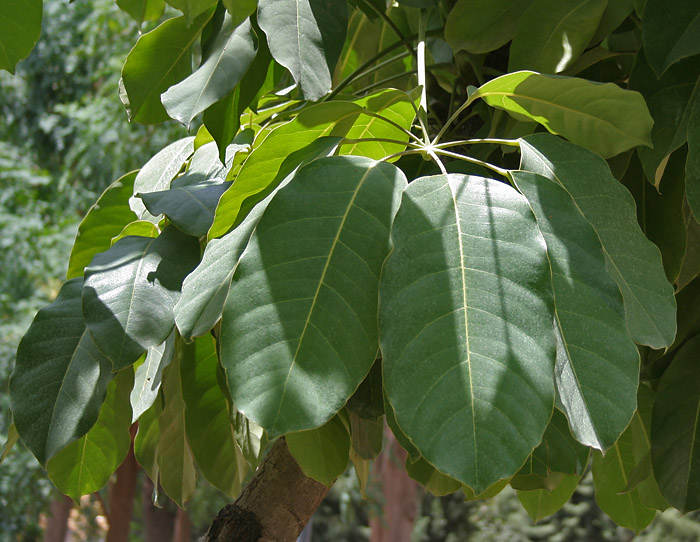
Leaves in Hyderabad

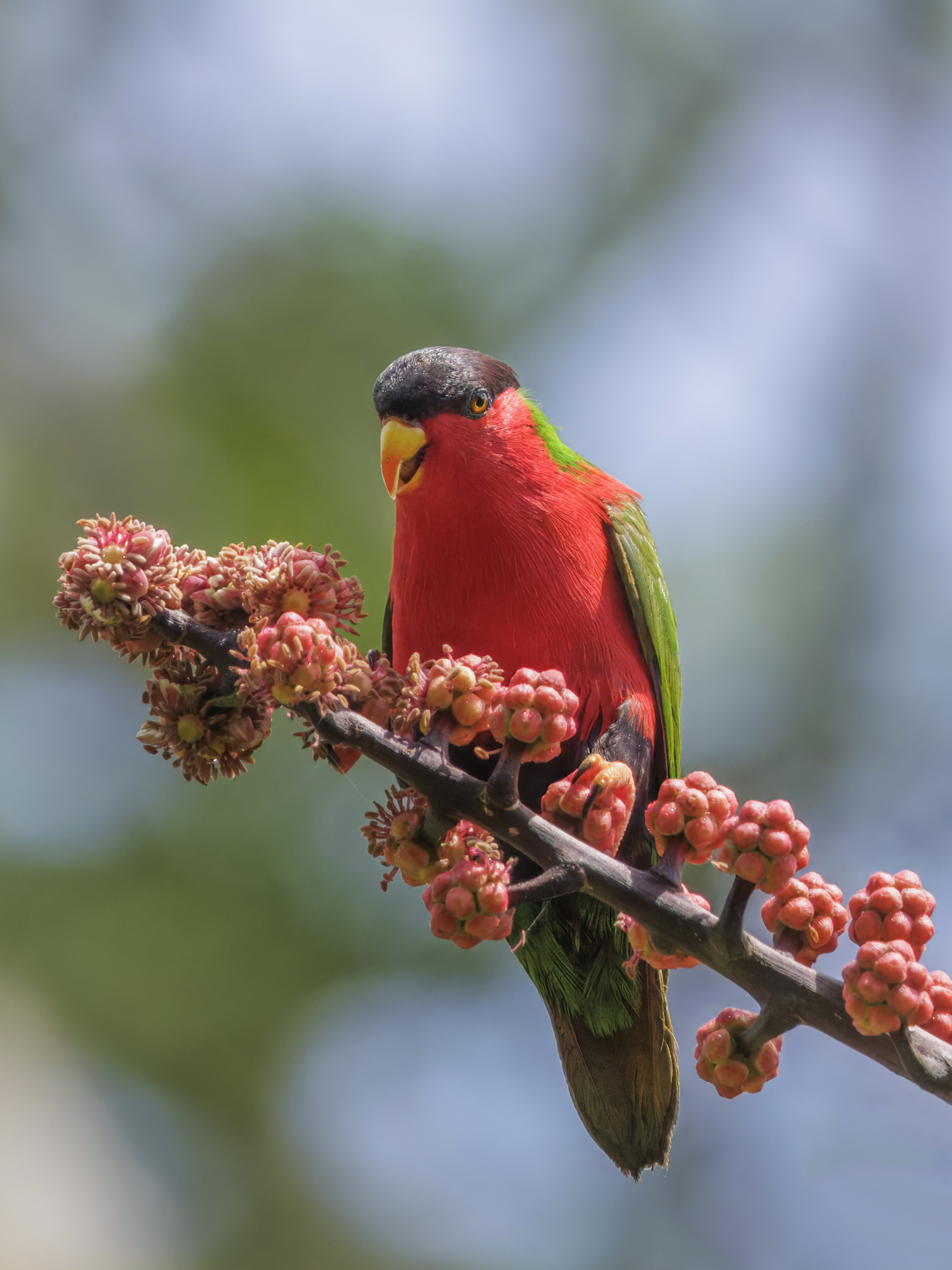
Collared lory feeding on an umbrella tree
