= Gregory M. Plunkett =

American botanist

- Born: 21 February 1965 (age 61)

Gregory M. Plunkett (born 21 February 1965 in Bayonne, New Jersey) is an American botanist.
