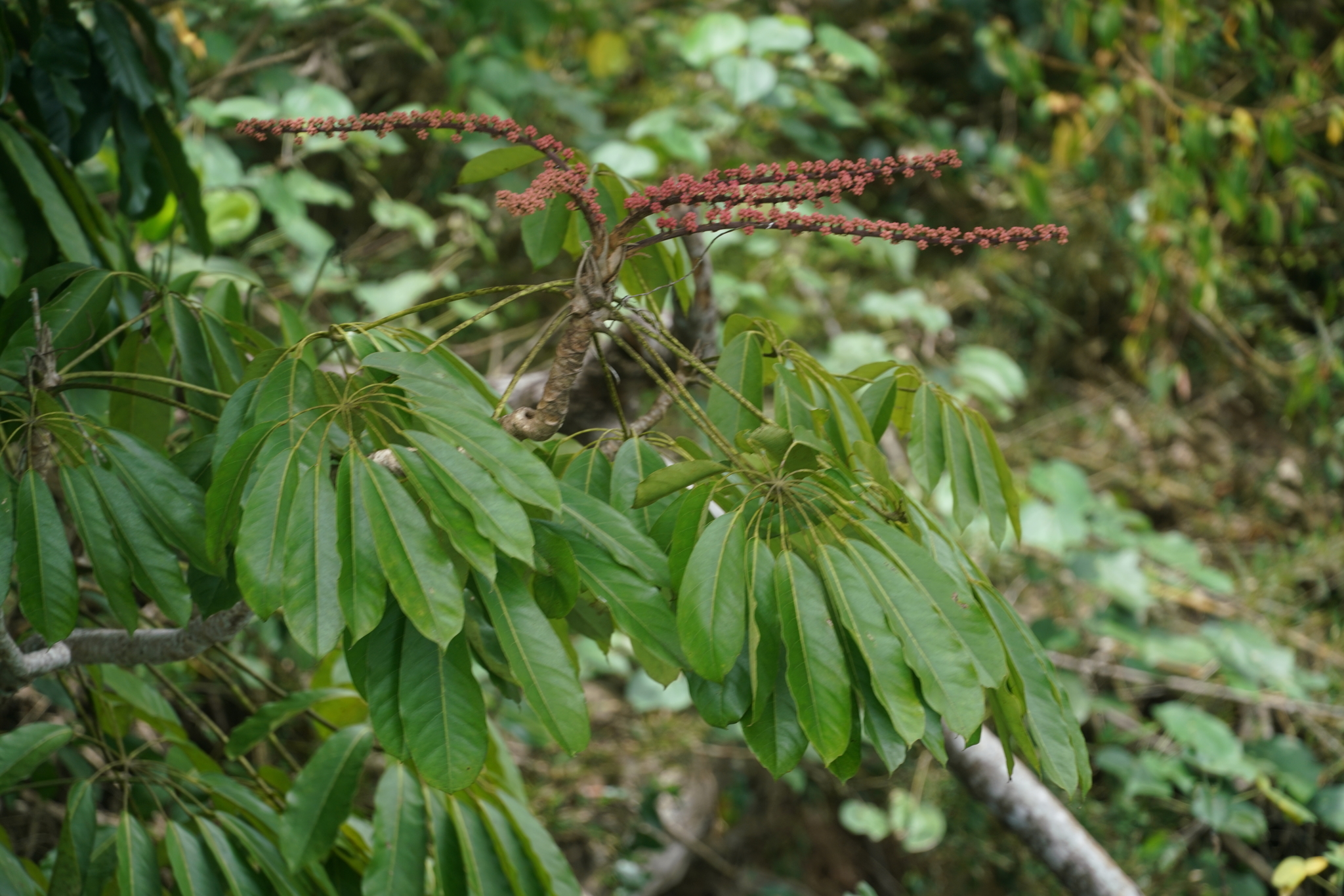
- Heptapleurum actinophyllum

Scientific classification
- Kingdom: Plantae
- Clade: Embryophytes
- Clade: Tracheophytes
- Clade: Angiosperms
- Clade: Eudicots
- Clade: Asterids
- Order: Apiales
- Family: Araliaceae
- Subfamily: Aralioideae
- Genus: Heptapleurum; Gaertn.

Species
- See List of Heptapleurum species

Synonyms
- Actinomorphe (Miq.) Miq.; Agalma Miq.; Brassaia Endl.; Cephaloschefflera (Harms) Merr.; Gynapteina (Blume) Spach; Heptoneurum Hassk.; Parapanax Miq.; Paratropia (Blume) DC.; Scheffleropsis Ridl.; Tupidanthus Hook.f. & Thomson; Unjala Blume

= Heptapleurum =

Genus of flowering plants

Heptapleurum is a genus of flowering plants in the family Araliaceae, the ivy or ginseng family. These plants are native to Southeast Asia: Malesia, Papuasia, southern China, Vietnam, the Indian Subcontinent, Tibet, Hainan, Taiwan, Japan, and Australia. The genus was phylogenetically resurrected from the genus Schefflera in 2020. It is the largest genus of Araliaceae with 321 accepted species as of November 2025.

Heptapleurum includes species commonly grown as houseplants or garden ornamentals (such as Heptapleurum arboricola). Some species are threatened, endangered, or critically endangered by deforestative habitat loss and extreme endemism, such as Heptapleurum acuminatissimum, which is known only from a single location with an estimated extent of occurrence of only 4 km^{2} (1.5 sq mi).

They are commonly scrambling subshrubs to small trees, with many epiphytic and vining members.
