= Quince (disambiguation) =

Quince (Cydonia oblonga) is a fruit tree and its fruit.

Quince may also refer to:

== Plants ==
- Pseudocydonia sinensis, a fruit tree known as Chinese quince
- Chaenomeles, a genus of shrubs known as flowering quinces
  - Chaenomeles japonica, known as Japanese quince
  - Chaenomeles speciosa, known as Chinese quince
- Aegle marmelos, known as Bengal quince
- Wild quince, the common name of several plant species
  - Alectryon subcinereus, an Australian tree in the family Sapindaceae
  - Callicoma serratifolia, an Australian tree in the family Cunoniaceae
  - Guioa semiglauca, an Australian tree in the family Sapindaceae

== People ==
- Khylee Quince, New Zealand lawyer and academic
- Peggy Quince (born 1948), Associate Justice of the Florida Supreme Court
- Peter Quince (fictional character), a carpenter that works in Athens in the romantic comedy A Midsummer Night's Dream
- Will Quince (born 1982), English Conservative Party politician, MP for Colchester since 2015
- Quince Duncan (born 1940), Spanish-language author from Costa Rica

== Other uses ==
- "Quinces", an episode of One Day at a Time (2017 TV series)
- Quince (company), an online retailer
- Quince (restaurant), San Francisco, California, United States
- 15 (number)

== See also ==
- XV International Brigade, Republican army brigade in the Spanish Civil War
- Quinceañera (fiesta de quince años) a celebration of a girl's 15th birthday that is common in Mexican and other Latin American cultures
- Quince Orchard (disambiguation)
- Quints
- Quincy (disambiguation)
