= Quincy =

Quincy may refer to:

== People ==
- Quincy (name), including a list of people with the name Quincy
- Quincy political family, including members of the family

== Places and jurisdictions ==
=== France ===
- Quincy, Cher, a commune in the Cher département
- A hamlet of Chilly in the Haute-Savoie département
- A former commune in the Seine-et-Marne département, now part of Quincy-Voisins

=== United States ===
- Quincy, California
- Quincy, Florida
- Quincy, Illinois
  - Quincy University, located in Quincy, Illinois
  - the former Roman Catholic Diocese of Quincy, now a Latin titular see
- Quincy, Indiana
- Quincy, Iowa
- Quincy, Kansas
- Quincy, Kentucky
- Quincy, Massachusetts, the first Quincy in the United States
- Quincy, Michigan
- Quincy, Mississippi
- Quincy, Missouri
- Quincy, Ohio
- Quincy, Oregon
- Quincy, Pennsylvania
- Quincy, Washington
- Quincy, West Virginia, in Kanawha County
- Quincy, Wisconsin, a town
  - Quincy (ghost town), Wisconsin, a ghost town
- Quincy Hollow, a section of Levittown, Pennsylvania
- Quincy Township (disambiguation)

== Structures ==
=== United States ===
- Quincy (CTA), a station on the Chicago Transit Authority's 'L' system
- Quincy House (disambiguation), several places
- Josiah Quincy House, a historical landmark in Quincy, Massachusetts built and owned by a Josiah Quincy
- Josiah Quincy Mansion, former mansion in Wollaston Park, Quincy, Massachusetts, built and owned by a Josiah Quincy
- Quincy Homestead, the Dorothy Quincy House and remaining homestead of the Quincy family
- Quincy Market, a historic building in the Faneuil Hall Marketplace shopping center in Boston, Massachusetts

== Ships ==
- USS Quincy, the name of several ships

== In pop culture ==
- Quincy (film), a 2018 American documentary film
- "Quincy / Kono Yo no Shirushi", a single by Korean singer BoA
- Quincy (band), a new wave power pop band from New Jersey

== Other uses ==
- Quincy AOC, an Appellation d'origine contrôlée (AOC) in the Loire Valley wine region of France
- Quincy Newspapers, a media company in Quincy, Illinois
- Quincy, an alternate spelling of quinzhee, snow shelter similar to an igloo

== See also ==
- Quincey (disambiguation)
- Quinsey (disambiguation)
- Quinsy (disambiguation)
- Quince (disambiguation)
