= Quinsey =

Quinsey may refer to:

People with the surname

- Vernon Quinsey (born 1944), Canadian psychologist
- Mark Quinsey (1985–2009), victim in the 2009 Massereene Barracks shooting
- Michael Quinsey, Canadian actor on Katts and Dog. Head Wrestling Coach for University of Toronto Varsity Blues, (2003–2017)

Other

- Quinsey, a name for peritonsillar abscess

== See also ==
- Quinzhee, a shelter made into snow
- Quinzy (band), Canadian musical group
- Quinsy (disambiguation)
- Quincy (disambiguation)
- Quincey (disambiguation)
