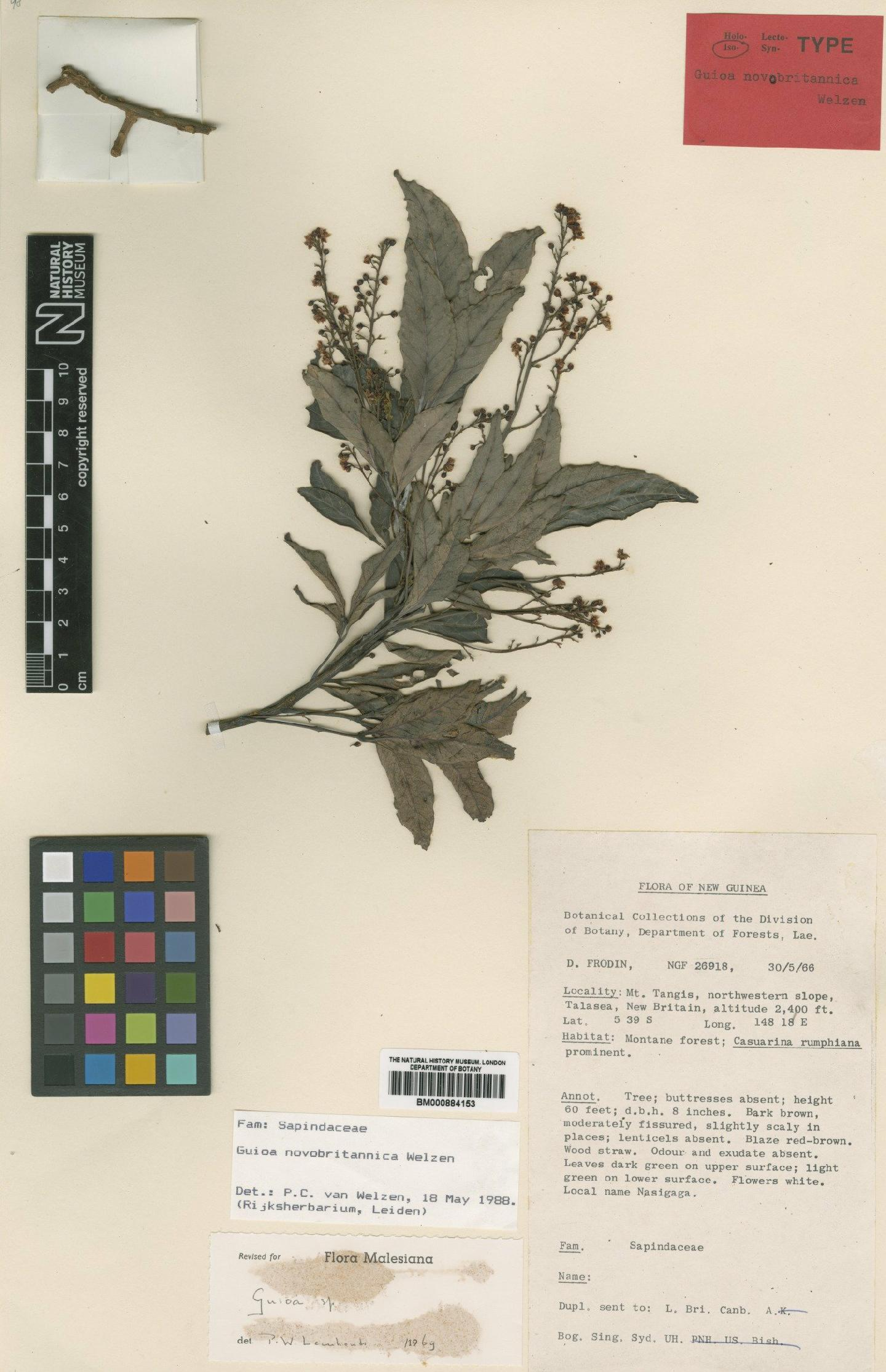

Conservation status
- Endangered (IUCN 3.1)

Scientific classification
- Kingdom: Plantae
- Clade: Tracheophytes
- Clade: Angiosperms
- Clade: Eudicots
- Clade: Rosids
- Order: Sapindales
- Family: Sapindaceae
- Genus: Guioa
- Species: G. novobritannica

Binomial name
- Guioa novobritannica Welzen

= Guioa novobritannica =

Species of tree

Guioa novobritannica is a species of plant in the family Sapindaceae. It is a tree endemic to the island of New Britain in Papua New Guinea.

It is known only from Mt. Tangis in Western New Britain, where is grows in submontane rain forest dominated by species of Casuarinaceae at around 740 meters elevation.

== Description ==
G. novobrittanica is a tree. Its leaves are elliptic in shape, densely covered in papillae (raised bumps) but bearing only a few hairs over most of the leaf surface below. However, each leaf does bear hairs which form a single sac-like domatium.

The petal scales are well-developed. They are 1.5 to 1.8 mm long, with a club-shaped, stalked crest. The floral disc is incomplete.

== Taxonomy ==
The species was described in 1988 by Peter C. van Welzen. The holotype was collected by David Gamman Frodin on Mt Tangis, New Britain in 1966 and deposited at the Leiden herbarium; duplicates are in several other herbaria.
