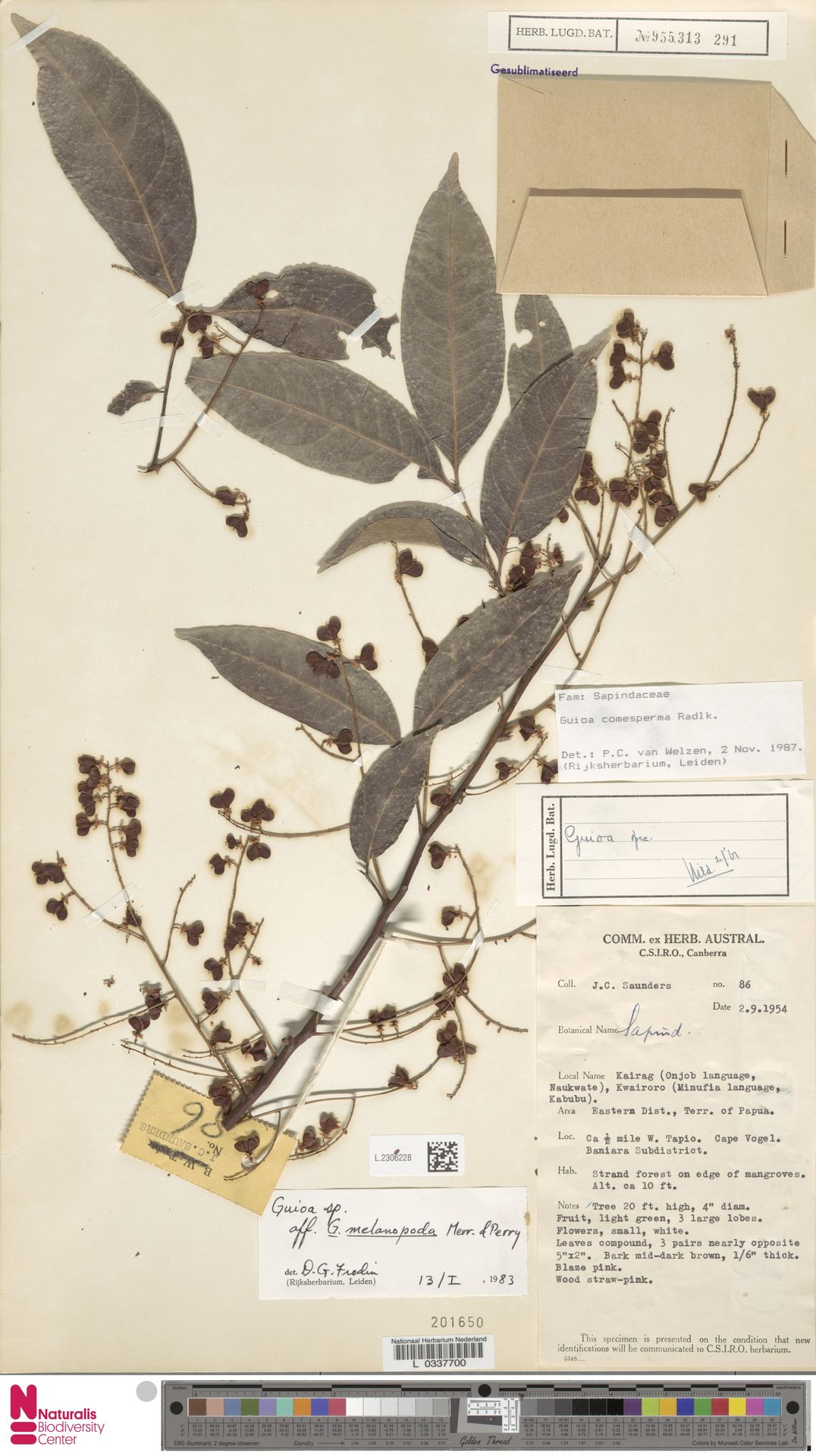
- Herbarium specimen

Scientific classification
- Kingdom: Plantae
- Clade: Tracheophytes
- Clade: Angiosperms
- Clade: Eudicots
- Clade: Rosids
- Order: Sapindales
- Family: Sapindaceae
- Genus: Guioa
- Species: G. comesperma

Binomial name
- Guioa comesperma Radlk.

= Guioa comesperma =

Species of tree

Guioa comesperma is a species of plant in the family Sapindaceae. It is found in New Guinea and its surrounding islands as well as in Australia.
