= Quinsy =

Quinsy may refer to:

- Quinsy, California; renamed Quincy, California
- Quinsy, a name for peritonsillar abscess
- Quinsy Gario (born 1984), Dutch anti-racist campaigner

== See also ==
- Quincy (disambiguation)
- Quinsey (disambiguation)
