= Lan Xuezhao =

Chinese-American venture capitalist

- Education: University of Michigan
- Occupation: Venture capitalist
- Known for: Founding San Francisco–based venture capital firm Basis Set Ventures

Lan Xuezhao is an American entrepreneur and venture capitalist. She is best known for founding Basis Set Ventures, a San Francisco–based venture capital firm that was one of the earliest to focus on early-stage artificial intelligence and automation startups. She has a research background with academic contributions on cognitive sciences. Her most cited work was published in the journal Science.

== Early life and education ==
Xuezhao earned a M.A. in Statistics (2008) and a Ph.D. in Psychology (2009) from the University of Michigan. Her doctoral research focused on quantitative cognitive science, and she has published findings in leading academic journals, including Science.

== Career ==
After completing her Ph.D., Xuezhao founded a startup developing brain-training games for children, which was later acquired. She subsequently worked at McKinsey & Company as an engagement manager. In 2013, she joined Dropbox, leading the Corporate Development Strategy team and overseeing mergers and acquisitions strategy.

In 2017, Xuezhao founded Basis Set Ventures (BSV), a venture capital firm that invests in AI and automation-focused startups. She launched the firm with over a hundred million in funding, emphasizing a data-driven approach to venture investing. BSV developed internal tools such as the AI system “Pascal” for sourcing potential startups and the HyperGrowth platform to connect portfolio companies with mentors.

Under Xuezhao’s leadership, BSV expanded with subsequent funds of $165 million (2021), $185 million (2023) and $250 million (2026), bringing total assets under management to over $850 million. The firm invests primarily in AI-driven enterprise software and infra-first consumer companies. Notable portfolio companies include Scale AI, Path Robotics, Workstream, Ergeon, Quince, Cusp and Drata.

== Recognition ==
In 2025, Xuezhao was named to Business Insider's "Seed 40" list of the best women early-stage investors. She was named to the list again in 2026, when the selection was made with a proprietary "Moneyball for VC" AI model.

Also in 2026, Basis Set Ventures was included in Time magazine's ranking of America's Top Venture Capital Firms, a list of 350 U.S. firms compiled with Statista. Xuezhao was also included in the 2026 Strebulaev-Jackson Venture Ranking of the top 100 venture capitalists at emerging firms, compiled by Stanford finance professor Ilya Strebulaev.

Xuezhao serves on the advisory board of the University of Michigan School of Information, where she mentors students and advises on AI and data science research.
