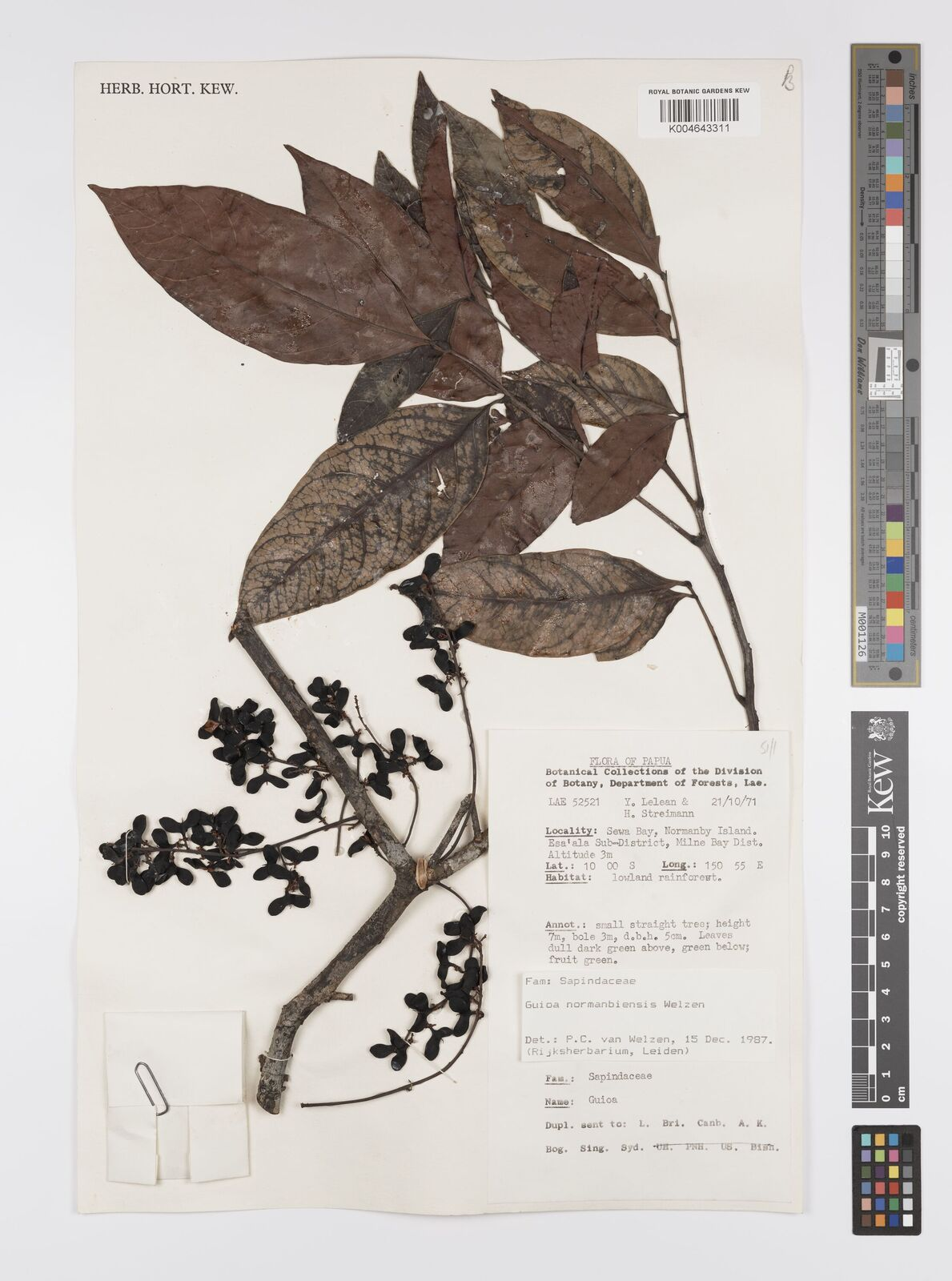

Conservation status
- Endangered (IUCN 3.1)

Scientific classification
- Kingdom: Plantae
- Clade: Tracheophytes
- Clade: Angiosperms
- Clade: Eudicots
- Clade: Rosids
- Order: Sapindales
- Family: Sapindaceae
- Genus: Guioa
- Species: G. normanbiensis

Binomial name
- Guioa normanbiensis Welzen

= Guioa normanbiensis =

Species of tree

Guioa normanbiensis is a species of flowering plant in the family Sapindaceae. It is a tree endemic to Normanby Island in the Louisiade Archipelago of eastern Papua New Guinea. It is typically a small tree of about 7 metres but can grow up to 20 metres tall. It is native to lowland rain forest, typically growing along gullies from sea level up to 200 metres elevation.
