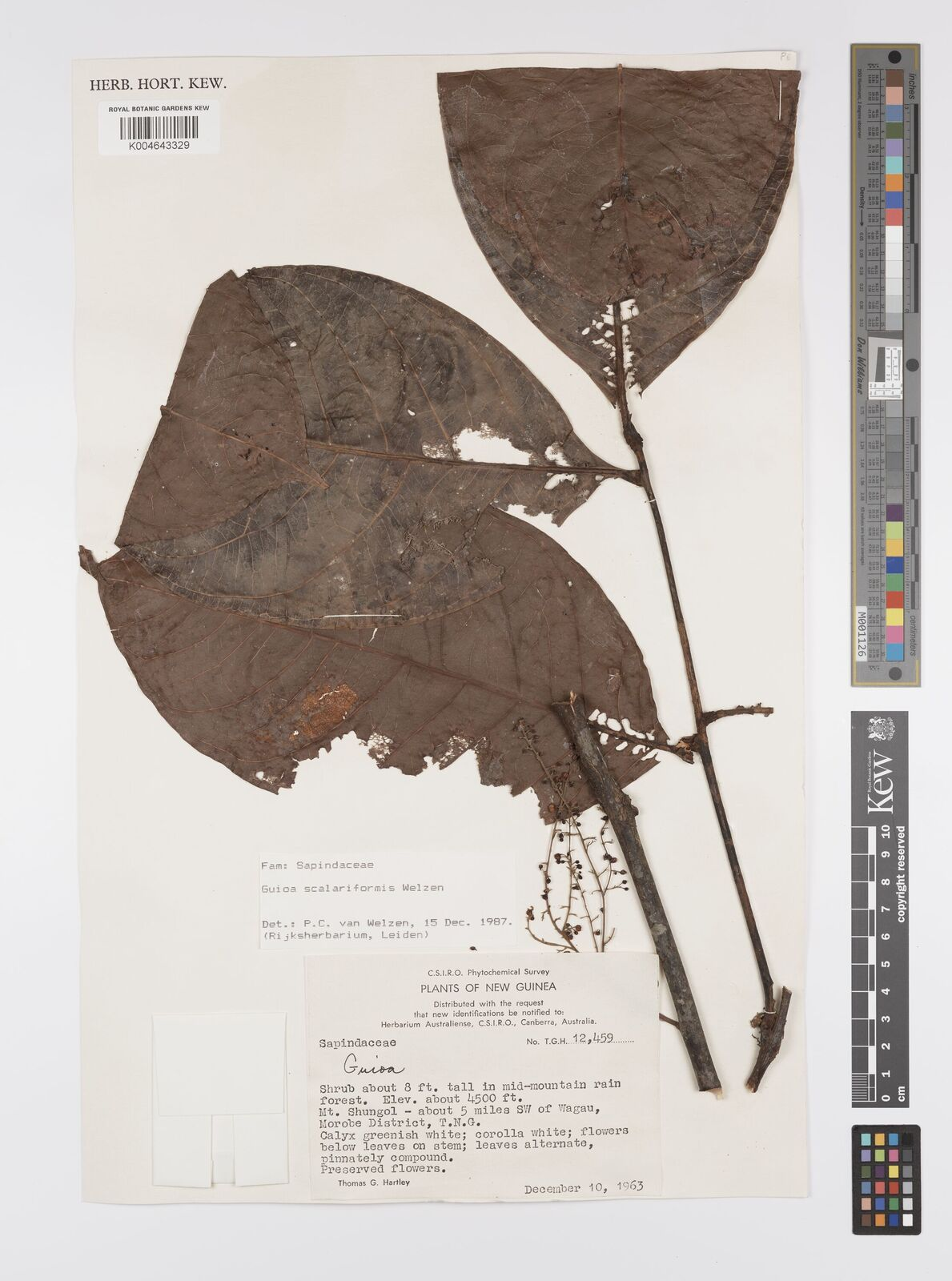

Conservation status
- Vulnerable (IUCN 3.1)

Scientific classification
- Kingdom: Plantae
- Clade: Tracheophytes
- Clade: Angiosperms
- Clade: Eudicots
- Clade: Rosids
- Order: Sapindales
- Family: Sapindaceae
- Genus: Guioa
- Species: G. scalariformis

Binomial name
- Guioa scalariformis Welzen

= Guioa scalariformis =

Species of flowering plant

Guioa scalariformis is a species of flowering plant in the family Sapindaceae. It is endemic to Papua New Guinea.
