= USS Quincy (CA-71) =

Heavy cruiser of the United States Navy

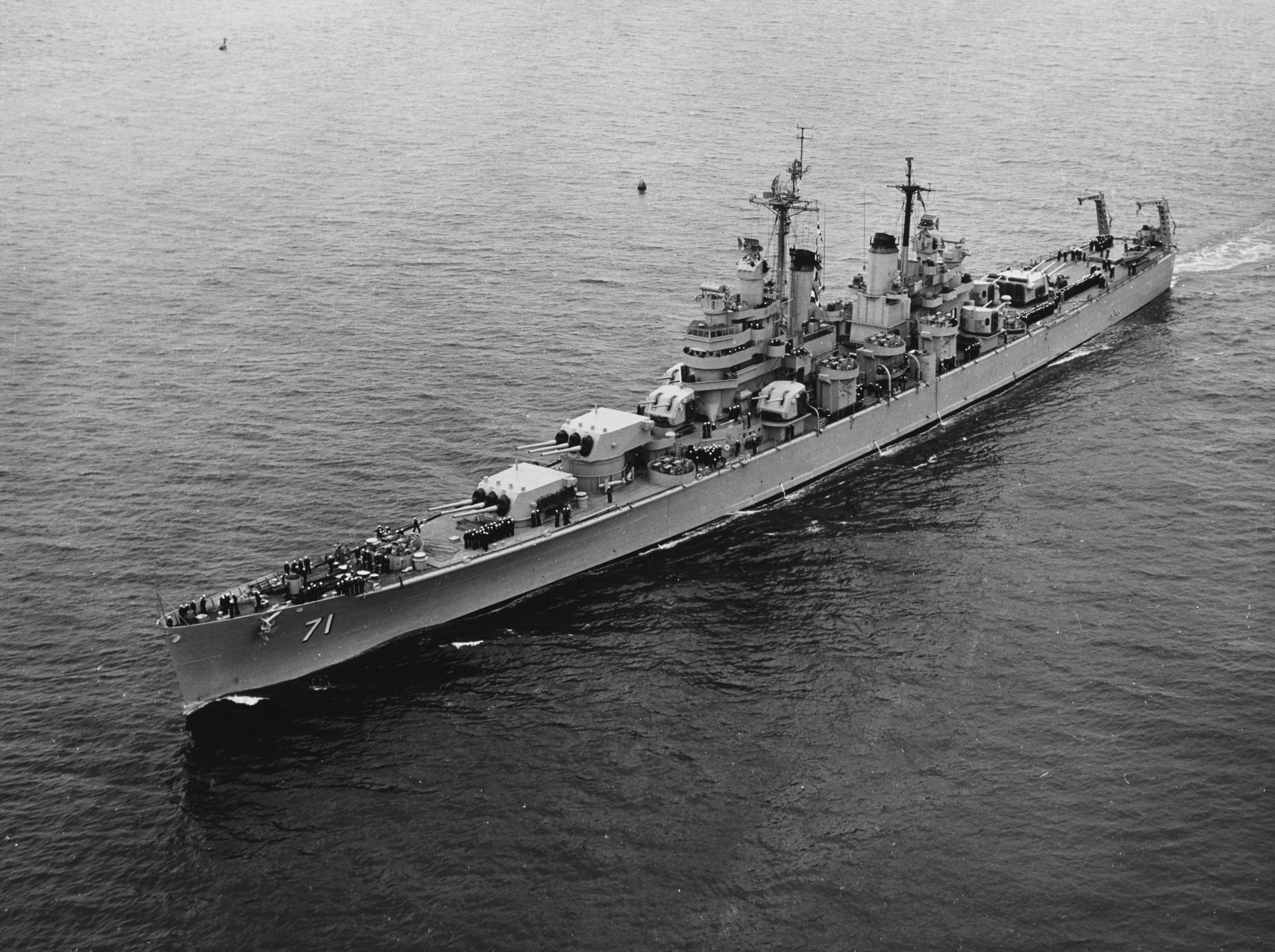
- USS Quincy underway, 1952–1954

History

United States
- Name: Quincy
- Namesake: City of Quincy, Massachusetts
- Ordered: 17 June 1940
- Builder: Fore River Shipyard
- Laid down: 9 October 1941
- Launched: 23 June 1943
- Sponsored by: Mrs. Henry S. Morgan
- Commissioned: 15 December 1943
- Decommissioned: 2 July 1954
- Stricken: 1 October 1973
- Identification: Callsign: NWGJ; Hull number: CA-71
- Honors and awards: See Awards
- Fate: Scrapped, 1974

General characteristics
- Class & type: Baltimore-class heavy cruiser
- Displacement: 13,600 long tons (13,818 t)
- Length: 673 ft 5 in (205.26 m)
- Beam: 70 ft 10 in (21.59 m)
- Draft: 20 ft 6 in (6.25 m)
- Speed: 33 kn (61 km/h; 38 mph)
- Complement: 1,142 officers and enlisted
- Armament: 9 × 8 in (203 mm)/55 caliber guns (3x3); 12 × 5 in (127 mm)/38 caliber anti-aircraft guns (AA) (6x2); 48 × 40 mm (1.57 in) Bofors AA guns (12x4); 24 × 20 mm (0.79 in) Oerlikon AA cannons (24x1)
- Aircraft carried: 4 × OS2U Kingfisher
- Aviation facilities: Stern hangar for 4 aircraft(wings folded); 2 × catapults

USS Quincy (CA-71), laid down as St. Paul, was a heavy cruiser of the Baltimore-class of the United States Navy. She was the third ship to carry the name.

== Construction ==
The third Quincy was authorized on 17 June 1940, and laid down at the Fore River Shipyard of the Bethlehem Steel Company, Quincy, Massachusetts, as St. Paul on 9 October 1941. Renamed Quincy on 16 October 1942, to perpetuate that name, after the destruction of the second Quincy (CA-39) at the Battle of Savo Island on 9 August 1942. She was launched on 23 June 1943; sponsored by Mrs. Catherine Adams-Morgan, wife of Henry S. Morgan, daughter of Charles Francis Adams, and sponsor of the previous Quincy. She was commissioned at the U.S. Naval Drydock, South Boston, Massachusetts, on 15 December 1943, with Captain Elliot M. Senn in command.

== Service history ==
=== World War II ===
After a shakedown cruise in the Gulf of Paria, between Trinidad and Venezuela, the new heavy cruiser was assigned, 27 March 1944, to Task Force 22 and trained in Casco Bay, Maine, until she steamed to Belfast, Northern Ireland, with TG 27.10, arriving 14 May and reporting to Commander, 12th Fleet for duty. General Dwight D. Eisenhower, Supreme Commander, Allied Expeditionary Force, accompanied by Rear Admiral Alan G. Kirk, inspected the ship's company in Belfast Lough 15 May 1944.

USS Quincy sailed out of Belfast Lough, 20 May, for the Clyde and anchored off Greenock, Scotland, to begin special training in shore bombardment. She then returned to Belfast Lough, and began final preparations for the invasion of Europe. Her float plane artillery observer pilots were temporarily assigned to VOS-7 flying Spitfires from RNAS Lee-on-Solent (HMS Daedalus). At 0537, 6 June 1944, she engaged shore batteries from her station on the right flank of Utah Beach, Baie de la Seine.

During the period 6 through 17 June, in conjunction with shore fire control parties and aircraft spotters, Quincy conducted highly accurate pinpoint firing against enemy mobile batteries and concentrations of tanks, trucks, and troops. She also neutralized and destroyed heavy, long range enemy batteries, supported minesweepers operating under enemy fire, engaged enemy batteries that were firing on the crews of the ships USS Corry (DD-463) and Glennon (DD-620) during their efforts to abandon their ships after they had struck mines and participated in the reduction of the town of Quinéville on 12 June.

Quincy steamed to Portland, England, 21 June, and joined TF 129. She departed Portland, 24 June, for Cherbourg, France. The bombardment of the batteries surrounding the city commenced in conjunction with the Army's assault at 1207. Nineteen of the twenty-one primary targets assigned the task force were successfully neutralized or destroyed thus enabling Army troops to occupy the city on 26 June.

The heavy cruiser sailed for Mers el-Kebir, North Africa, on 4 July, arriving there 10 July. She proceeded to Palermo, Sicily, 16 July, arriving two days later. Quincy, based at Palermo through 26 July, conducted shore bombardment practice at Camarota in the Gulf of Policastro. She then steamed to Malta via the Straits of Messina. Between 27 July and 13 August, the cruiser participated in training exercises at Malta and Camarota, Italy.

On the afternoon of 13 August, in company with four British cruisers, one French cruiser, and four American destroyers, Quincy departed Malta for the landings on the southern coast of France, arriving Baie de Cavalaire 15 August. For three days the group provided fire support on the left flank of the U.S. 7th Army. Quincy transferred 19 August to TG 86.4, and until the 24th, engaged the heavy batteries at Toulon, St. Mandrier, and Cape Sicie. She steamed westward the afternoon of 24 August to support minesweepers clearing the channel to Port de Bouc in the Marseille area.

USS Quincy was detached from European duty on 1 September, and steamed for Boston, arriving one week later. She remained at Boston for the installation of new equipment through 31 October, when she got underway for training in Casco Bay. After fitting out at Boston for a Presidential cruise, Quincy steamed for Hampton Roads, Virginia, 16 November.

President Franklin D. Roosevelt and his party embarked on Quincy on 23 January 1945, at Newport News, Virginia, for passage to Malta, arriving 2 February. After receiving calls by British Prime Minister Winston Churchill and other dignitaries, President Roosevelt departed Quincy and continued on to the Crimea by air to attend the Yalta Conference.

==== The Quincy Agreement ====
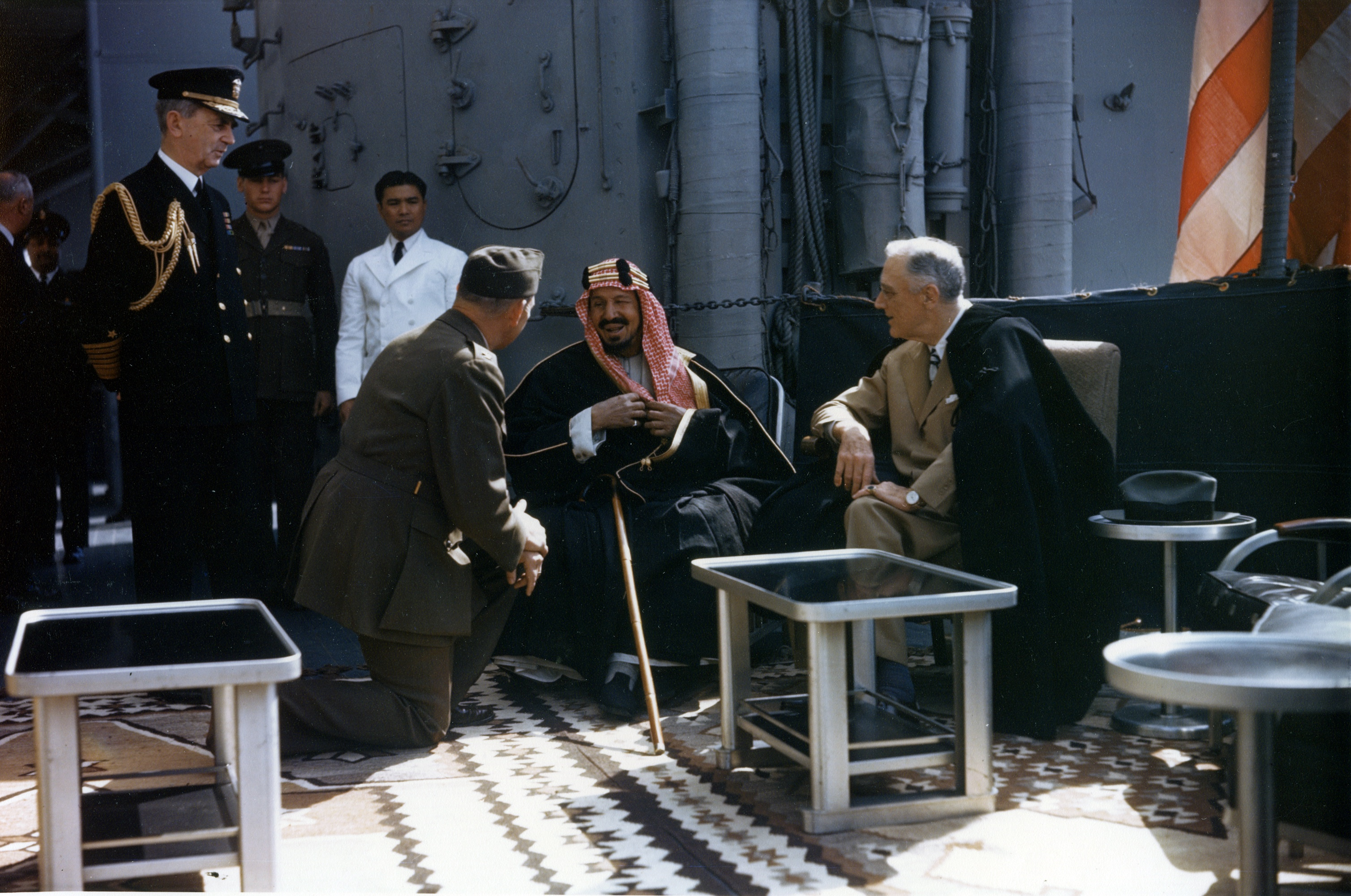
President Roosevelt with Abdul Aziz of Saudi Arabia; kneeling on one knee, Colonel William A. Eddy (organizer of the meeting and serving as interpreter) and on the left Admiral William Leahy aboard Quincy. In the background is Sergeant James Pendry, orderly to FDR during the President’s cruise.

USS Quincy departed Malta 6 February 1945, and arrived at the Great Bitter Lake in the Suez Canal two days later, after calling at Ismalia, Egypt. The president and his party returned to Quincy on 12 February, following the Yalta Conference with Soviet leader Josef Stalin and Churchill, and the next day received King Farouk of Egypt and Haile Selassie, Emperor of Ethiopia.

From 14 February, President Roosevelt and King Abdul Aziz of Saudi Arabia, known in the West as Ibn Saud, met aboard Quincy. During the meeting, President Roosevelt tried to persuade Ibn Saud to give support for Jewish immigration to Palestine, and hoped that Ibn Saud might be able to offer constructive advice on the Palestine issue. There, Roosevelt and Saud concluded a secret agreement in which the U.S. would provide Saudi Arabia military security – military assistance, training and a military base at Dhahran in Saudi Arabia – in exchange for secure access to supplies of oil.

After a call at Alexandria, and a final meeting between President Roosevelt and Prime Minister Churchill, Quincy steamed for Algiers, arriving on 18 February. The President's senior aide, Maj. Gen. Edwin "Pa" Watson, who had been ailing, died aboard ship on 20 February. Following a presidential conference with the American ambassadors to Great Britain, France and Italy, the cruiser steamed for the United States, arriving at Newport News on 27 February.

==== Remainder of wartime career ====
USS Quincy sailed out of Hampton Roads 5 March 1945, arriving Pearl Harbor 20 March. After training in the Pearl Harbor area, she steamed for Ulithi via Eniwetok, joining the 5th Fleet there 11 April. Two days later, she departed Ulithi and joined Rear Admiral Wiltse's Cruiser Division 10, in Vice Admiral Mitscher's Fast Carrier Task Force. From 16 April, Quincy supported the carriers in their strikes on Okinawa, Amami Gunto, and Minami Daito Shima. She returned to Ulithi with units of the task force 30 April.

In company with units of TF 58, Quincy departed Ulithi 9 May, for the area east of Kyushu, Japan, arriving 12 May for carrier strikes against Amami Gunto and Kyushu. Before dawn on 14 May, the cruiser splashed a Japanese plane. Her own aircraft strafed targets in Omonawa on Tokune Shima 19 May. Quincy continued to support carrier aircraft strikes against Okinawa, Tokuno Shima, Kikai Jima, Amami Gunto, and Asumi Gunto until the force returned to base 13 June. En route, Quincy safely rode out the severe typhoon of 5 June.

During the period of replenishment and upkeep at Leyte in the Philippines, Rear Admiral Wiltse, ComCruDiv 10 transferred to Quincy. The cruiser departed Leyte 1 July with Task Force 38 to begin a period of strikes at Japan's home islands which lasted until the termination of hostilities on V-J Day. She supported carriers in strikes in the Tokyo Plains area, Honshu, Hokkaido, and Shikoku.

Quincy joined the Support Force, 23 August, and four days later, helped occupy Sagami Wan, Japan, and entered Tokyo Bay 1 September.

Rear Admiral Wiltse transferred his flag 17 September to Vicksburg (CL-86), and 20 September, Quincy joined the 5th Fleet as a unit of the Eastern Japan Force, TF 53, basing in Tokyo Bay.

=== Korean War ===
Quincy was decommissioned on 19 October 1946, in the Puget Sound Naval Shipyard, Bremerton, Washington. She was assigned to the Bremerton Group, Pacific Reserve Fleet until 31 January 1952, when she recommissioned to serve in the 7th Fleet in support of United Nations Forces in Korea. Following fitting out and readiness training, she served in the screen of the Fast Carrier Task groups ranging off the coastline of Korea from 25 July 1953 to 1 December 1953. She again decommissioned 2 July 1954, at Bremerton.

=== Fate ===
Quincy sat in the reserve fleet at the Puget Sound Naval Shipyard until she was stricken on 1 October 1973. She was the only one of her class to retain her Bofors 40 mm gun mounts instead of receiving the newer 3/50 mounts. Of the Baltimore class she had the second shortest active career (Fall River was in service just 2 1/2 years), and was in active service for only 5 1/2 years. She was sold to American Ship Dismantling Co., Portland Oregon on 1 September 1974 for $1,156,667.66.

== Awards ==
- European-African-Middle Eastern Campaign Medal with two battle stars
- Asiatic-Pacific Campaign Medal with two battle stars
- World War II Victory Medal
- Navy Occupation Medal with "ASIA" clasp
- National Defense Service Medal
- Korean Service Medal with one battle star
- Korean Presidential Unit Citation
- United Nations Korea Medal
- Korean War Service Medal (South Korea)

== Legacy ==
In honor of the meeting between Saudi's King Abdul Aziz and Franklin D. Roosevelt aboard Quincy, the official residence of the American ambassador to Saudi Arabia is named Quincy House, and is located on the Diplomatic Quarter in Riyadh. In 1995, to commemorate 50 years since the meeting occurred, then–U.S. Ambassador Ray Mabus unveiled a detailed model of the meeting on Quincy, paid for with private donations, and this model is still on display today at Quincy House.

Quincy's ship bell has been preserved, and is on display at Marina Bay in Quincy, Massachusetts.
