= Guioa acuminata =

Conservation status
- Vulnerable (IUCN 3.1)

Scientific classification
- Kingdom: Plantae
- Clade: Tracheophytes
- Clade: Angiosperms
- Clade: Eudicots
- Clade: Rosids
- Order: Sapindales
- Family: Sapindaceae
- Genus: Guioa
- Species: G. acuminata

Binomial name
- Guioa acuminata Radlk.

Species of tree

Guioa acuminata is a species of plant in the family Sapindaceae. It is endemic to the Philippines.

== Distribution and habitat ==
Guioa acuminata is endemic to the Philippines and naturally occurs in ultrabasic and secondary forests at elevations ranging from 100 to 320 meters above sea level.
