= Quincy Township =

Quincy Township may refer to:

- Quincy Township, Adams County, Illinois
- Quincy Township, Adams County, Iowa
- Quincy Township, Greenwood County, Kansas
- Quincy Township, Branch County, Michigan
- Quincy Township, Houghton County, Michigan
- Quincy Township, Olmsted County, Minnesota
- Quincy Township, Pennsylvania

== See also ==
- Quincy (disambiguation)
