= Quincy House =

Quincy House may refer to:

- Quincy House (Harvard), a residential house at Harvard
- Quincy House (U.S. Ambassador residence), the U.S. ambassador's residence in Riyadh
- Josiah Quincy House, a National Historic Landmark home built by Josiah Quincy
- Quincy House (Boston, Massachusetts), a former hotel in downtown Boston
- Quincy House (Brookland), a notable residence in Washington, DC.
- Dorothy Quincy Homestead, Quincy, Massachusetts, a U.S. National Historic Landmark
