= Guioa pauciflora =

Conservation status
- Vulnerable (IUCN 2.3)

Scientific classification
- Kingdom: Plantae
- Clade: Tracheophytes
- Clade: Angiosperms
- Clade: Eudicots
- Clade: Rosids
- Order: Sapindales
- Family: Sapindaceae
- Genus: Guioa
- Species: G. pauciflora

Binomial name
- Guioa pauciflora Radlk.

Species of flowering plant

Guioa pauciflora is a species of plant in the family Sapindaceae. It is found in Indonesia (Western New Guinea) and Papua New Guinea.
