= Guioa myriadenia =

Conservation status
- Endangered (IUCN 2.3)

Scientific classification
- Kingdom: Plantae
- Clade: Tracheophytes
- Clade: Angiosperms
- Clade: Eudicots
- Clade: Rosids
- Order: Sapindales
- Family: Sapindaceae
- Genus: Guioa
- Species: G. myriadenia

Binomial name
- Guioa myriadenia Radlk.

Species of flowering plant

Guioa myriadenia is a species of plant in the family Sapindaceae. It is endemic to the Philippines.
