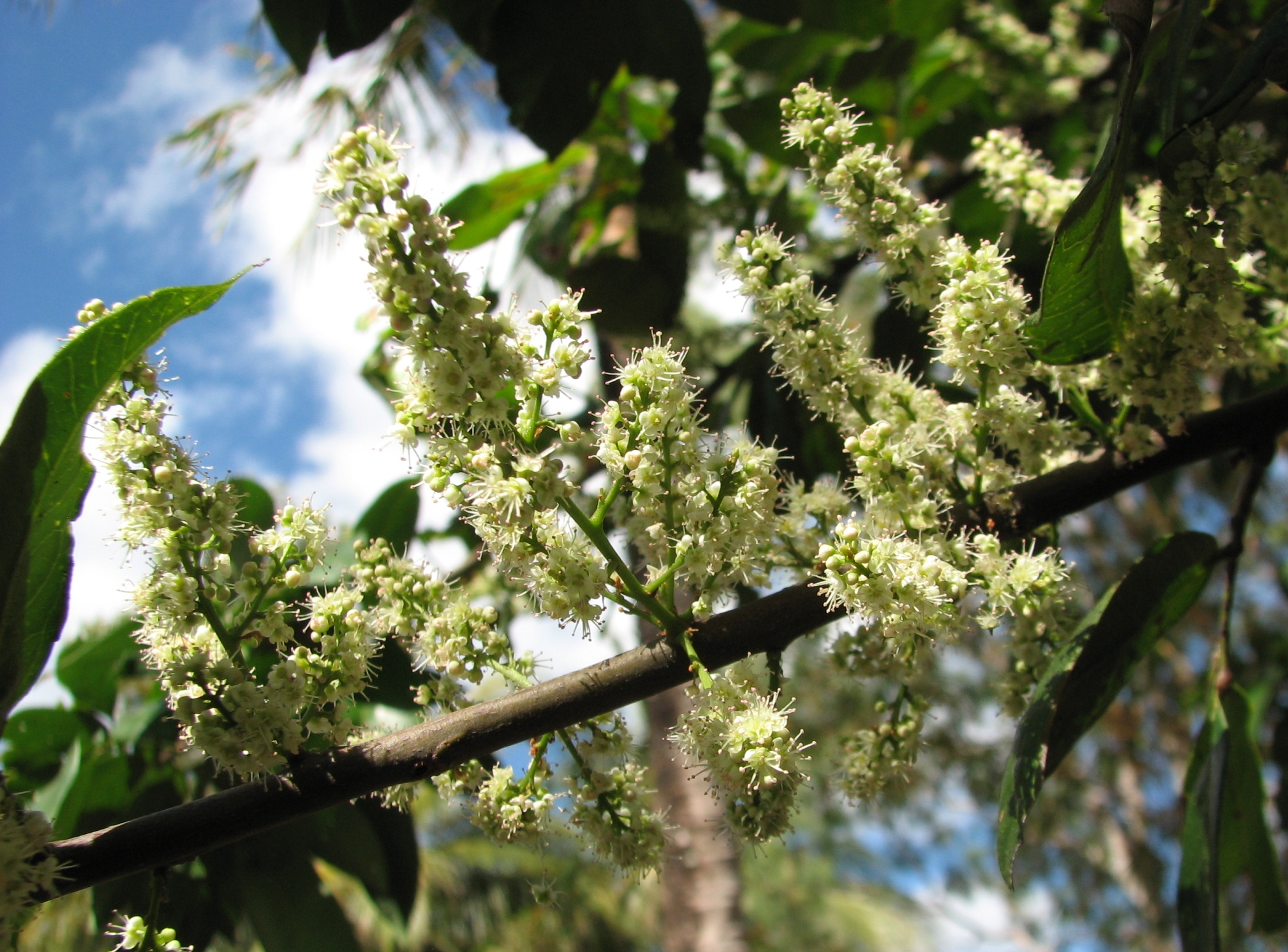

Conservation status
- Least Concern (NCA)

Scientific classification
- Kingdom: Plantae
- Clade: Tracheophytes
- Clade: Angiosperms
- Clade: Eudicots
- Clade: Rosids
- Order: Sapindales
- Family: Sapindaceae
- Genus: Guioa
- Species: G. acutifolia

Binomial name
- Guioa acutifolia Radlk.

= Guioa acutifolia =

Species of tree

Guioa acutifolia is an evergreen tree from New Guinea and coastal areas of eastern Queensland in Australia. Common names include glossy tamarind, northern guioa and sharp-leaf guioa. It grows up to 20 metres high and has smooth, grey bark on its trunk which may be up to 15 cm wide. The sweetly scented flowers are produced between August and October in the species' native range Flowers and fruits often appear on immature trees.

The species was formally described in 1879 by Bavarian botanist Ludwig Radlkofer. Although Radlkofer's name may have been based on an earlier description by Ferdinand von Mueller of an acute-leaved variety of Cupania semiglauca, this did not include a varietal name. Mueller's description was based on plant material collected from Port Denison, Rockingham Bay and Mossman River.

Guioa acutifolia is found on beaches and among mangroves as well as at higher altitudes along creeks in the understorey of rainforest edges. In Australia it occurs from Cape York, south to Fraser Island.

Plants are propagated from seed and require some shade until established.
