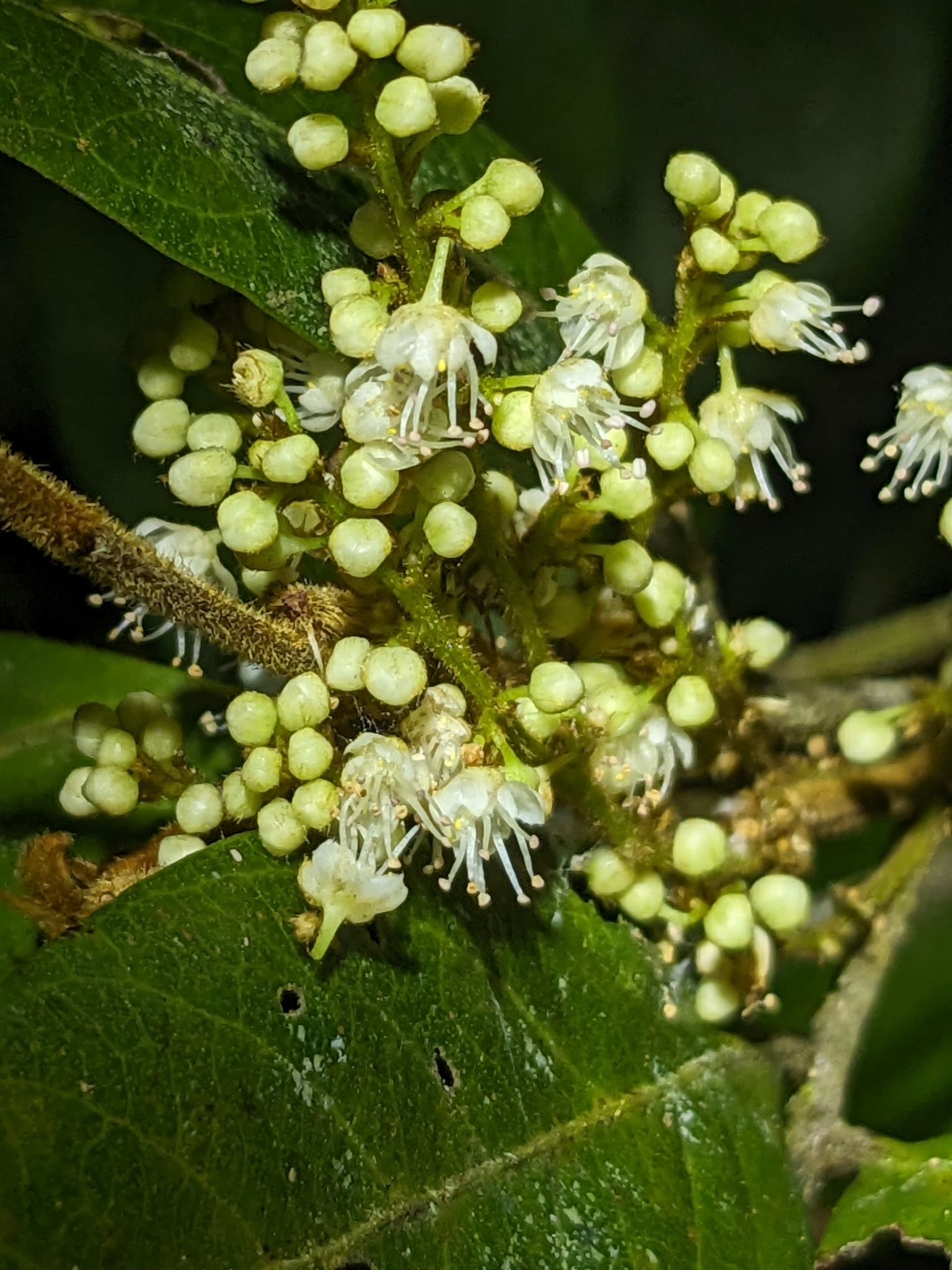
- Inflorescence

Conservation status
- Least Concern (IUCN 3.1)

Scientific classification
- Kingdom: Plantae
- Clade: Tracheophytes
- Clade: Angiosperms
- Clade: Eudicots
- Clade: Rosids
- Order: Sapindales
- Family: Sapindaceae
- Genus: Guioa
- Species: G. lasioneura

Binomial name
- Guioa lasioneura Radlk.

= Guioa lasioneura =

Species of flowering plant

Guioa lasioneura, commonly known as silky tamarind or woolly-nerved Guioa, is a species of plant in the maple and lychee family Sapindaceae. It is native to northern and central parts of eastern Queensland, Australia.

== Description ==
Guioa lasioneura is a small tree growing to about 15 m (49 ft) tall. Young twigs and shoots are hairy, leaves are compound with one or two pairs of leaflets each. The leaflets are either sessile or attached by a very short stalk up to 5 mm (0.20 in) long. They measure up to 12.5 cm (4.9 in) long by 4 cm (1.6 in) wide. Small flowers are clustered on short inflorescences about 10 cm (3.9 in) long. The fruit is a pink-purple three-lobed capsule up to 14 mm (0.55 in) long and 22 mm (0.87 in) wide.

== Taxonomy ==
The species was first described in 1879 by Bavarian botanist Ludwig Adolph Timotheus Radlkofer.

== Distribution and habitat ==
It grows as an understorey tree in lowland and upland rainforest, at altitudes from near sea level to about 1,000 m (3,300 ft). Its range extends from around Cape Tribulation to near Mackay, with the majority of sightings having been made between Palm Cove and the Paluma Range National Park.

== Conservation ==
As of November 2025, this species has been assessed to be of least concern by the International Union for Conservation of Nature (IUCN) and by the Queensland Government under its Nature Conservation Act.

The IUCN has not identified any threats to the species and considers the population to be stable.

== Gallery ==
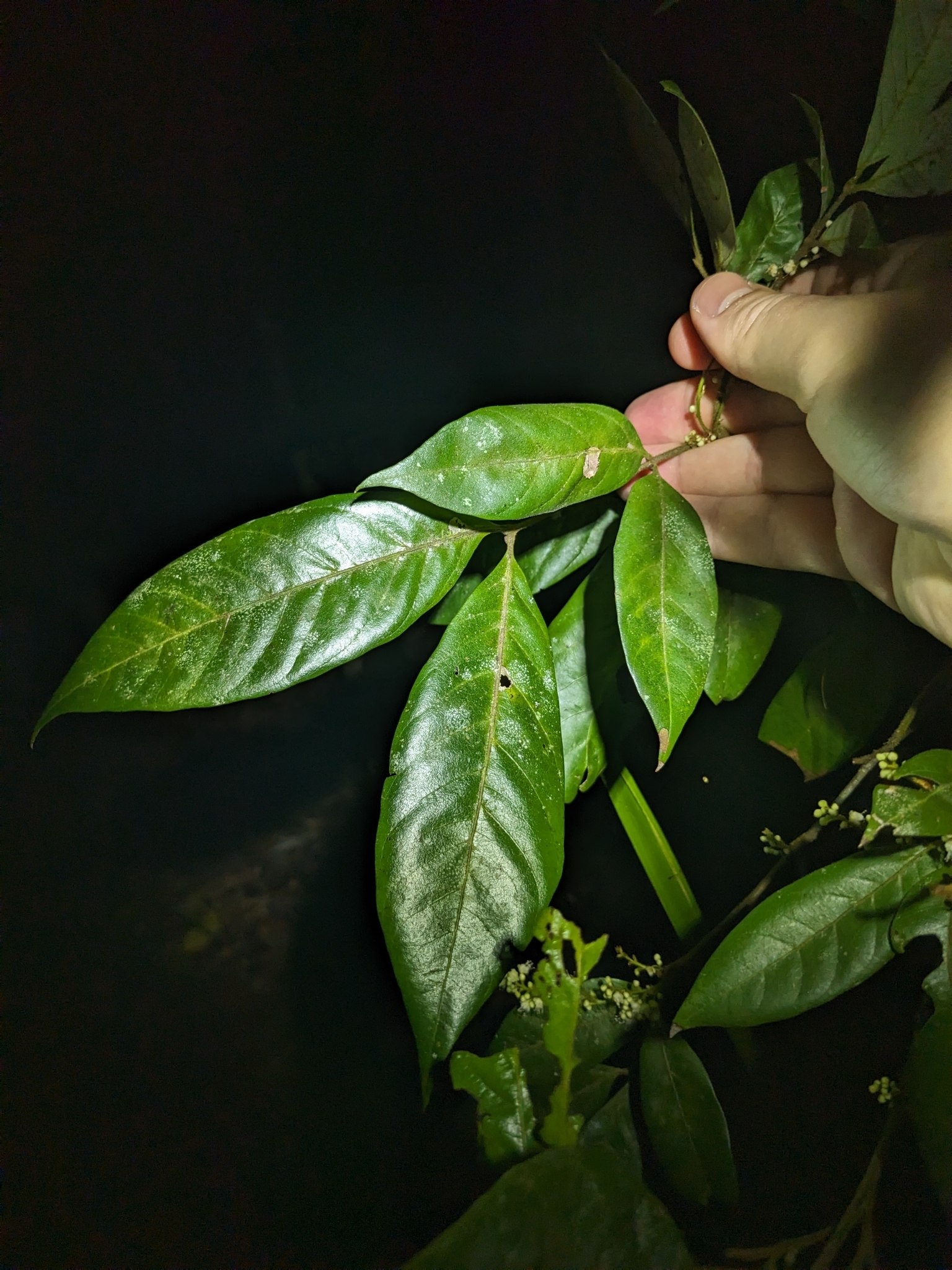
Leaves

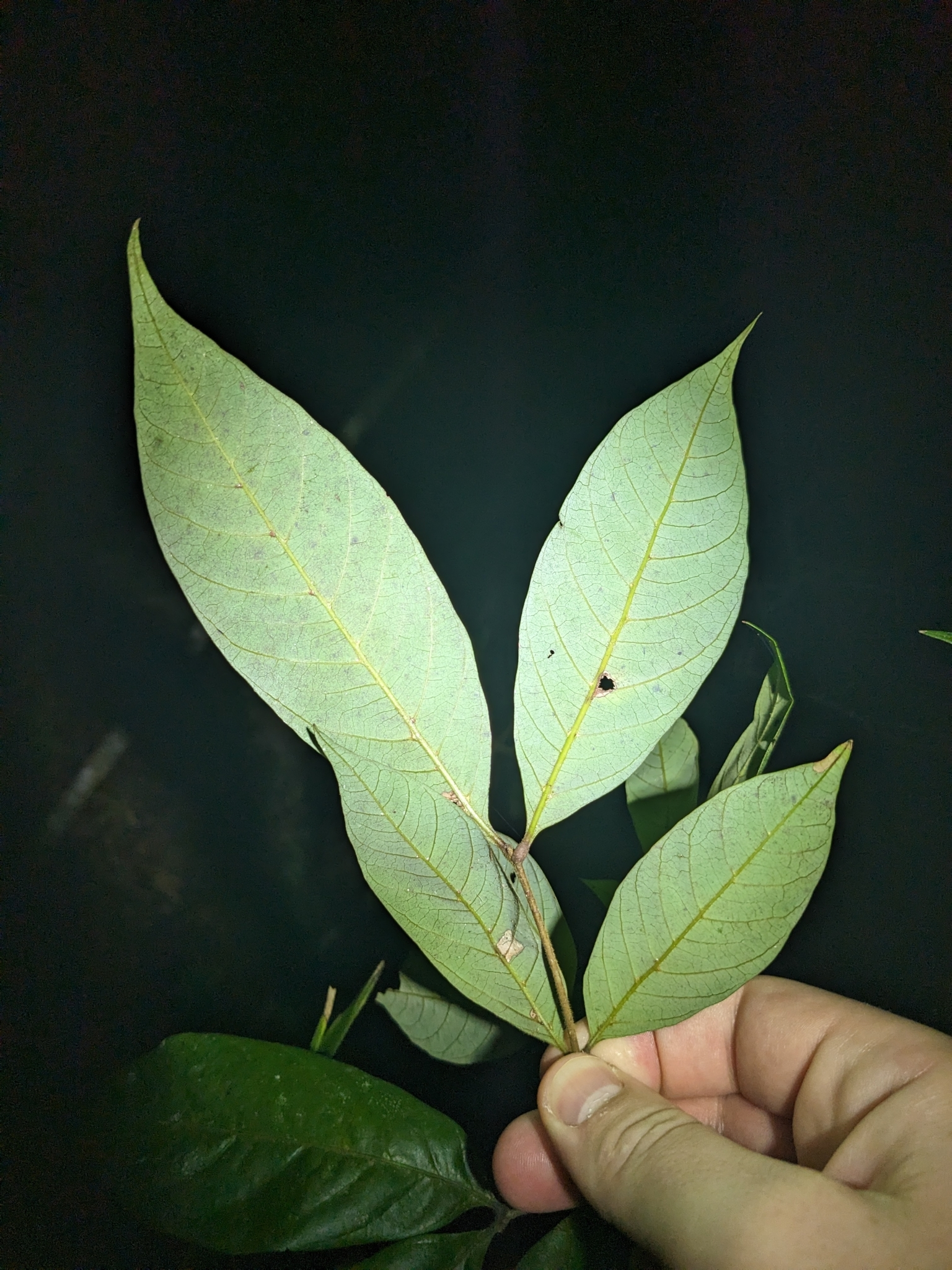
Underside

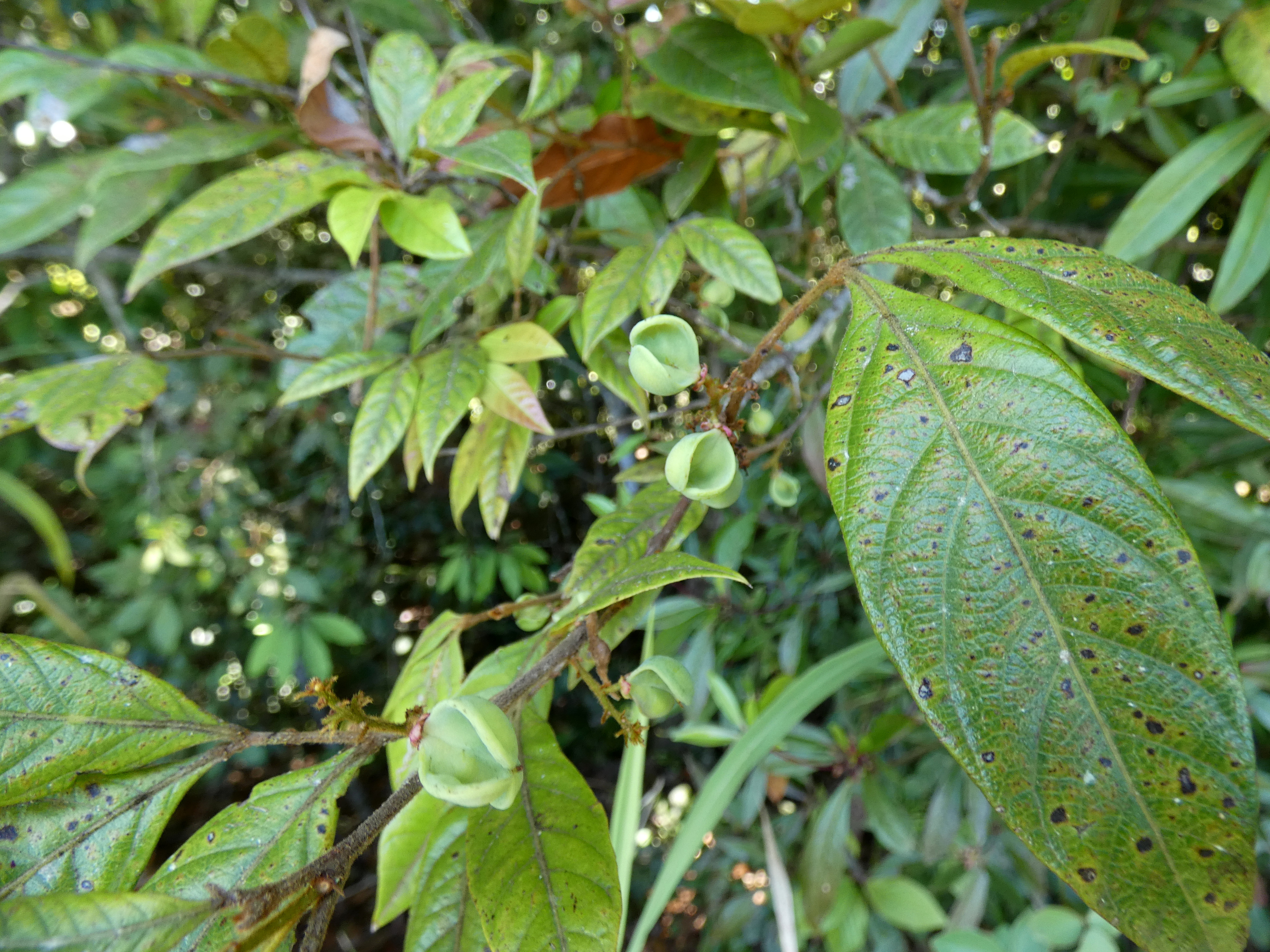
Immature fruit
