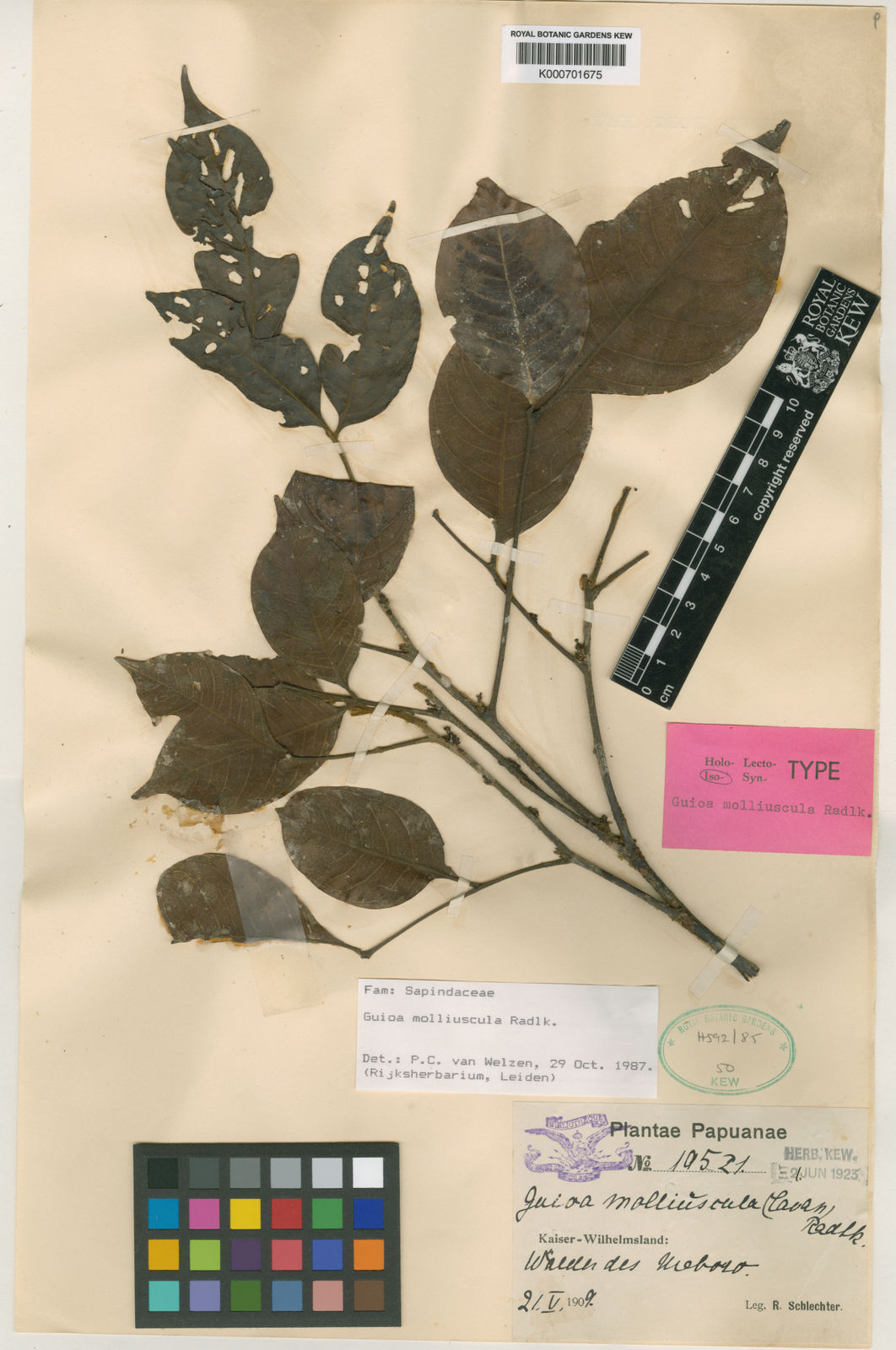

Conservation status
- Near Threatened (IUCN 3.1)

Scientific classification
- Kingdom: Plantae
- Clade: Tracheophytes
- Clade: Angiosperms
- Clade: Eudicots
- Clade: Rosids
- Order: Sapindales
- Family: Sapindaceae
- Genus: Guioa
- Species: G. molliuscula

Binomial name
- Guioa molliuscula Radlk.

= Guioa molliuscula =

Species of tree

Guioa molliuscula is a species of plant in the family Sapindaceae. It is endemic to Papua New Guinea.
