= Guioa asquamosa =

Conservation status
- Vulnerable (IUCN 2.3)

Scientific classification
- Kingdom: Plantae
- Clade: Tracheophytes
- Clade: Angiosperms
- Clade: Eudicots
- Clade: Rosids
- Order: Sapindales
- Family: Sapindaceae
- Genus: Guioa
- Species: G. asquamosa

Binomial name
- Guioa asquamosa Welzen

Species of flowering plant

Guioa asquamosa is a species of plant in the family Sapindaceae. It is endemic to Timor and Flores in Indonesia. It is a vulnerable species threatened by habitat loss.
