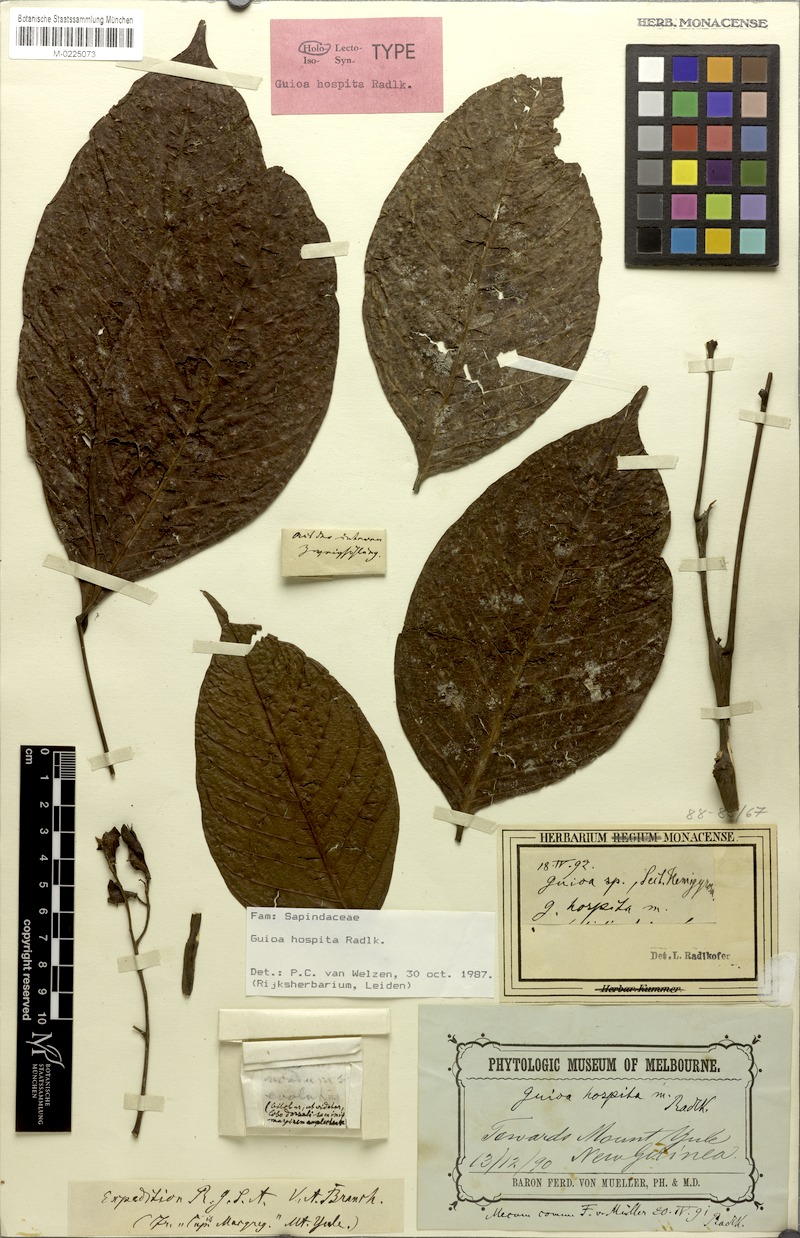

Conservation status
- Critically Endangered (IUCN 3.1)

Scientific classification
- Kingdom: Plantae
- Clade: Tracheophytes
- Clade: Angiosperms
- Clade: Eudicots
- Clade: Rosids
- Order: Sapindales
- Family: Sapindaceae
- Genus: Guioa
- Species: G. hospita

Binomial name
- Guioa hospita Radlk.

= Guioa hospita =

Species of flowering plant

Guioa hospita is a species of plant in the family Sapindaceae. It is endemic to Papua New Guinea.
