= Guioa bicolor =

Conservation status
- Vulnerable (IUCN 2.3)

Scientific classification
- Kingdom: Plantae
- Clade: Tracheophytes
- Clade: Angiosperms
- Clade: Eudicots
- Clade: Rosids
- Order: Sapindales
- Family: Sapindaceae
- Genus: Guioa
- Species: G. bicolor

Binomial name
- Guioa bicolor Merr.

Species of flowering plant

Guioa bicolor is a species of plant in the family Sapindaceae. It is endemic to the Philippines.
