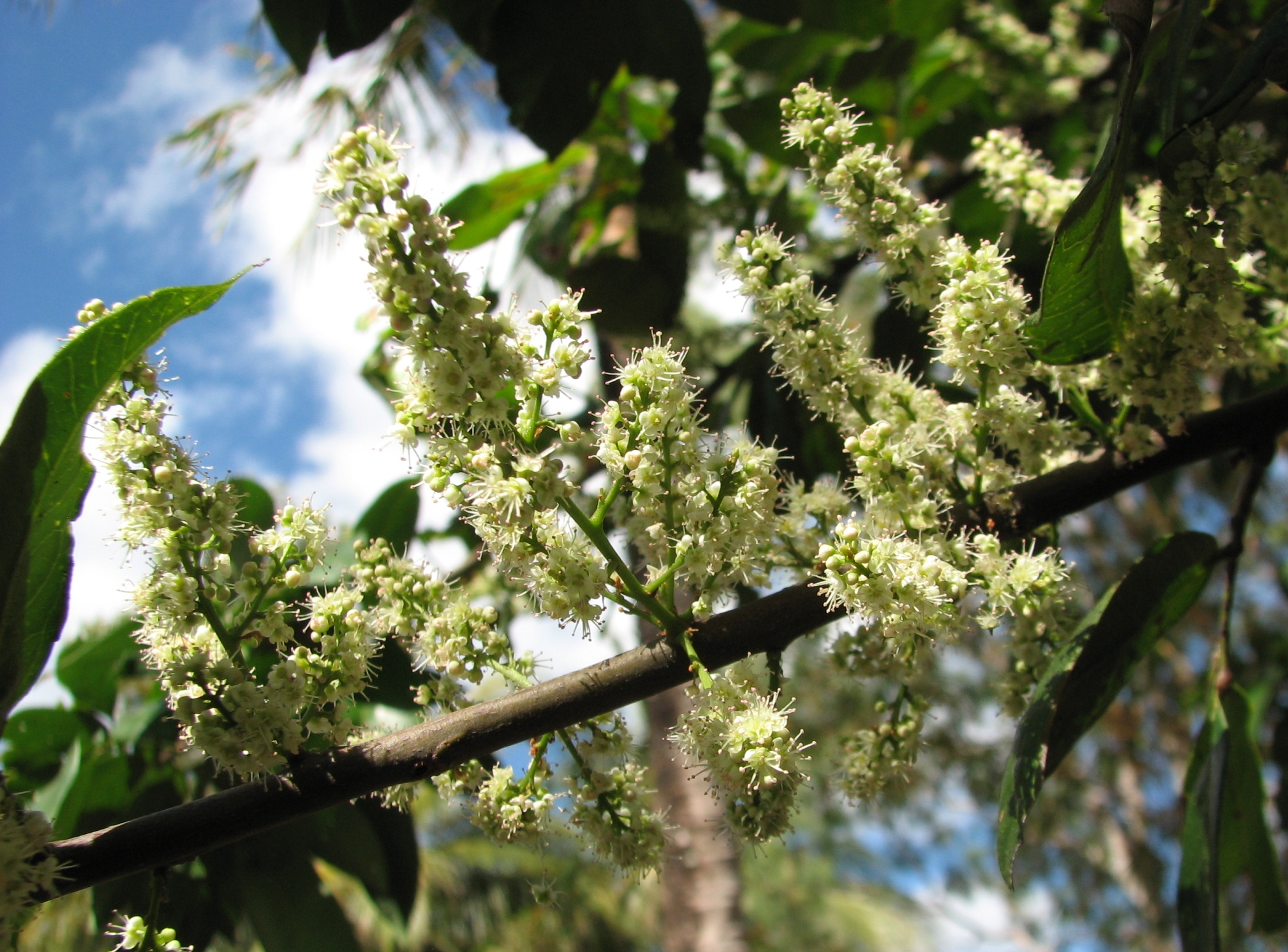
- Guioa acutifolia, glossy tamarind, flowers and foliage, Kewarra Beach, Cairns, north-eastern Queensland, Australia
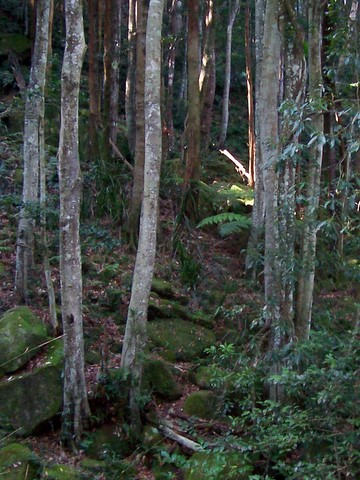
- Guioa semiglauca trunks in a stand at Foxground, Illawarra, New South Wales, Australia

Scientific classification
- Kingdom: Plantae
- Clade: Tracheophytes
- Clade: Angiosperms
- Clade: Eudicots
- Clade: Rosids
- Order: Sapindales
- Family: Sapindaceae
- Tribe: Cupanieae
- Genus: Guioa; Cav.

Type species
- Guioa lentiscifolia Cav.

Species
- See text

= Guioa =

Genus of plants

Guioa is a genus of about 70 described species in the maple and lychee family Sapindaceae. It has a wide distribution, ranging from mainland Southeast Asia, through Malesia and Papuasia to eastern Australia and islands of the western Pacific.

Many Guioa species are threatened to varying degrees, as recognised by the International Union for Conservation of Nature (IUCN). Twenty five species have IUCN statuses of either critically endangered, endangered or vulnerable.

The Australian species are known to the logging industry as cedars, though they have no direct relationship with true cedars nor the Australian members of the Meliaceae which are also known as cedars.

== Species ==
The following is a complete list of species accepted by Plants of the World Online. As of October 2025 there are 69 species:

- Guioa acuminata Radlk. – vulnerable
- Guioa acutifolia Radlk.
- Guioa amabilis Kaneh. & Hatus.
- Guioa aryterifolia Radlk. – endangered
- Guioa aryteroides Guillaumin
- Guioa asquamosa Welzen – vulnerable
- Guioa bicolor Merr. – vulnerable
- Guioa bijuga (Hiern) Radlk.
- Guioa capillacea A.C.Sm.
- Guioa chrysea A.C.Sm.
- Guioa comesperma Radlk.
- Guioa contracta Radlk.
- Guioa coriacea (Radlk.) Radlk.
- Guioa crenata Radlk.
- Guioa crenulata Radlk.
- Guioa diplopetala (Hassk.) Radlk.
- Guioa discolor Radlk. – vulnerable
- Guioa elegans Radlk.
- Guioa elliptica Welzen
- Guioa fusca Radlk.
- Guioa glauca (Labill.) Radlk.
- Guioa gracilis (Pancher & Sebert) Radlk.
- Guioa grandifoliola Welzen – endangered
- Guioa hirsuta Welzen
- Guioa hospita Radlk. - critically endangered
- Guioa koelreuteria (Blanco) Merr.
- Guioa koniamboensis Guillaumin
- Guioa lasioneura Radlk.
- Guioa lentiscifolia Cav.
- Guioa malukuensis Welzen – vulnerable
- Guioa megacarpa Welzen
- Guioa melanopoda Merr. & L.M.Perry – vulnerable
- Guioa membranifolia Radlk. – vulnerable
- Guioa microsepala Radlk.
- Guioa misimaensis Welzen
- Guioa molliuscula Radlk. – near threatened
- Guioa montana C.T.White
- Guioa multijuga Welzen – endangered
- Guioa myriadenia Radlk. – endangered
- Guioa normanbiensis Welzen – endangered
- Guioa novobritannica Welzen – endangered
- Guioa novoebudaensis Welzen
- Guioa oligotricha Merr. & L.M.Perry – endangered
- Guioa ovalis Radlk.
- Guioa palawanica Welzen – endangered
- Guioa parvifoliola Merr. – critically endangered
- Guioa patentinervis Radlk. – vulnerable
- Guioa pauciflora Radlk. – vulnerable
- Guioa pectinata Radlk.
- Guioa pleuropteris (Blume) Radlk.
- Guioa plurinervis Radlk. – vulnerable
- Guioa pseudoamabilis Welzen
- Guioa pteropoda Radlk.
- Guioa pterorhachis Welzen
- Guioa pubescens (Zoll. & Moritzi) Radlk.
- Guioa punctata Welzen
- Guioa reticulata Radlk. – endangered
- Guioa rhoifolia (A.Gray) Radlk.
- Guioa rigidiuscula Radlk.
- Guioa sarcopterifructa Welzen
- Guioa scalariformis Welzen – vulnerable
- Guioa semiglauca (F.Muell.) Radlk.
- Guioa subsericea Radlk.
- Guioa sufusana Welzen
- Guioa truncata Radlk. – endangered
- Guioa unguiculata Welzen – vulnerable
- Guioa venusta Radlk.
- Guioa villosa Radlk.
- Guioa waigeoensis Welzen – vulnerable
