= Quince (company) =

Quince, an e-commerce company

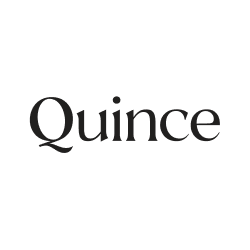
- Type: Private
- Industry: E-commerce
- Founded: 2018; 8 years ago
- Founders: Sid Gupta, Sourabh Mahajan, Becky Mortimer, and Zunu Mittal
- Headquarters: San Francisco, California, United States
- Key people: Sid Gupta (CEO)
- Products: Apparel, accessories, jewelry, home goods, wellness, beauty
- Website: www.quince.com

Quince is an American e-commerce company that offers apparel, accessories, jewelry, home goods, wellness and beauty products. It is headquartered in San Francisco, California and markets a “manufacturer-to-consumer” (M2C) model, in which goods are produced by partner factories and shipped directly to customers.

== History ==
Quince was founded in 2019 as Last Brand and rebranded to Quince in June 2020. Gupta is currently the CEO and Mahajan serves as the CTO. Part of its business model involved advertising through social media.

In 2023 Forbes listed the company in its Next Billion-Dollar Startups list. As of November 2025 the company employed some 800 employees and generated approximately $1.1 billion in annual revenue.

In 2026, Quince launched a Canadian website expanding its services to Canada (in addition to the United States).

== Funding and Valuation ==
In January 2025 the company raised a US$120 million Series C round led by Notable Capital and Wellington Management. In July 2025, Bloomberg reported that Quince raised Series D funding about US$200 million at a valuation above US$4.5 billion, in a round led by Iconiq Capital. In July 2025, the company raised $461 million. The company publicly launched in October 2020 and disclosed an $8.5 million seed round led by Founders Fund, 8VC, and Basis Set Ventures and is also backed by Insight Partners, and DST Global.

== Legal matters ==
Quince faced a lawsuit filed in November 2025 from Williams-Sonoma, who argued that Quince made ads with false claims that their products had the same quality as products found at Williams-Sonoma but with lower prices. Tapestry, Inc., the owner of Coach, filed their own lawsuit in April 2025, arguing that Quince infringed on the trade dress of two of their Coach handbag designs.

Quince was also involved in intellectual-property and trademark disputes with Yeti and Deckers Outdoor (UGG), as well as a trademark lawsuit with the Michelin-starred San Francisco restaurant Quince which was later settled. In the Deckers case, the jury invalidated Deckers' patent on the UGG boot design in question. However, they found that the Quince design would have infringed on the patent if the patent was valid.
