= Wild quince =

Wild quince may refer to one of several plant species:

- Alectryon subcinereus, an Australian tree in the family Sapindaceae
- Callicoma serratifolia, an Australian tree in the family Cunoniaceae
- Cydonia oblonga, wild relatives of the cultivated quince tree
- Guioa semiglauca, an Australian tree in the family Sapindaceae
