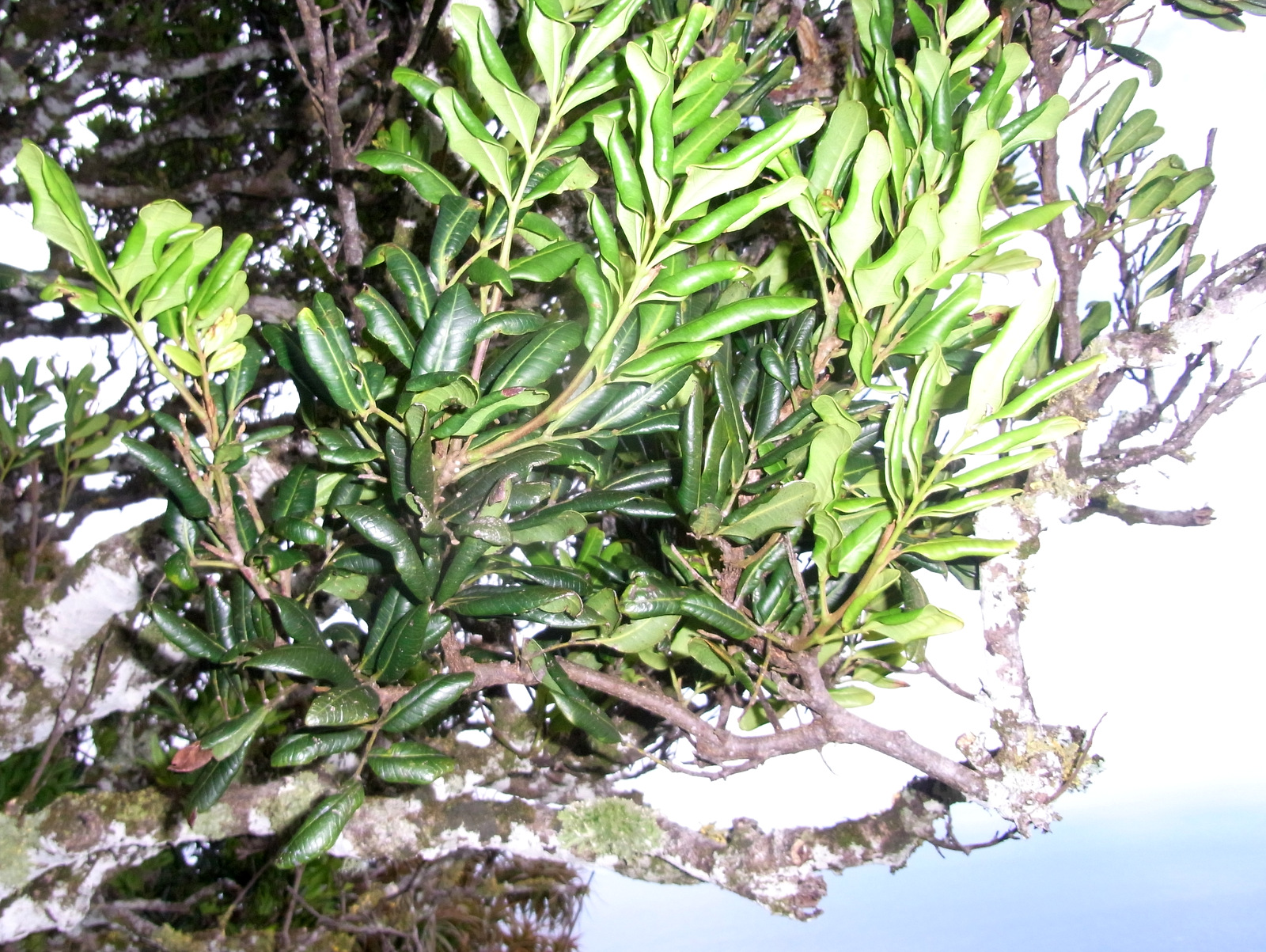

Scientific classification
- Kingdom: Plantae
- Clade: Tracheophytes
- Clade: Angiosperms
- Clade: Eudicots
- Clade: Rosids
- Order: Sapindales
- Family: Sapindaceae
- Genus: Guioa
- Species: G. coriacea

Binomial name
- Guioa coriacea (Radlk.) Radlk. (1886)

Synonyms
- Atalaya coriacea Radlk. (1878); Cupania howeana Maiden (1898)

= Guioa coriacea =

Species of flowering plant

Guioa coriacea , commonly known as cedar or island cedar, is a flowering plant in the family Sapindaceae. The specific epithet refers to the coriaceous (leathery) leaves.

== Description ==
It is a tree growing to 15 m in height. The shiny paripinnate leaves, with under-rolled edges and 1–4 pairs of leaflets, are 30–110 mm long, 12–50 mm wide. The white, tinged pink, 6 mm long flowers occur in clusters from December to February. The fruits are green-brown, 3-lobed woody capsules, 25 mm long. The small black seeds are 1–1.5 mm long and covered with a fleshy orange aril. The trees are often noticeable in early winter because of the orange arils on the seeds that have fallen to the ground.

== Distribution and habitat ==
The species is endemic to Australia’s subtropical Lord Howe Island in the Tasman Sea where it is common in sheltered lowland forest.
