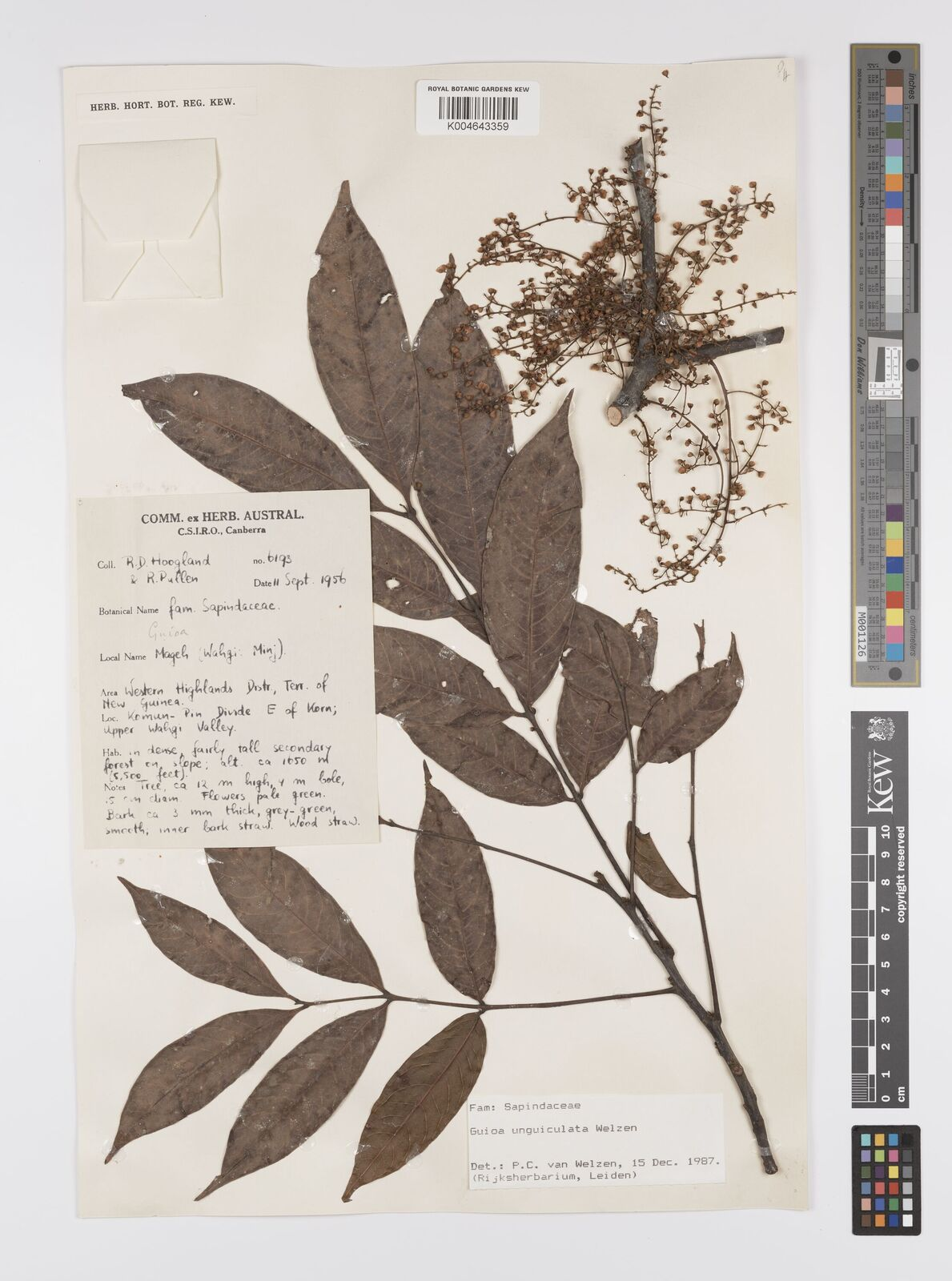

Conservation status
- Vulnerable (IUCN 3.1)

Scientific classification
- Kingdom: Plantae
- Clade: Tracheophytes
- Clade: Angiosperms
- Clade: Eudicots
- Clade: Rosids
- Order: Sapindales
- Family: Sapindaceae
- Genus: Guioa
- Species: G. unguiculata

Binomial name
- Guioa unguiculata Welzen

= Guioa unguiculata =

Species of tree

Guioa unguiculata is a species of plant in the family Sapindaceae endemic to Papua New Guinea.
