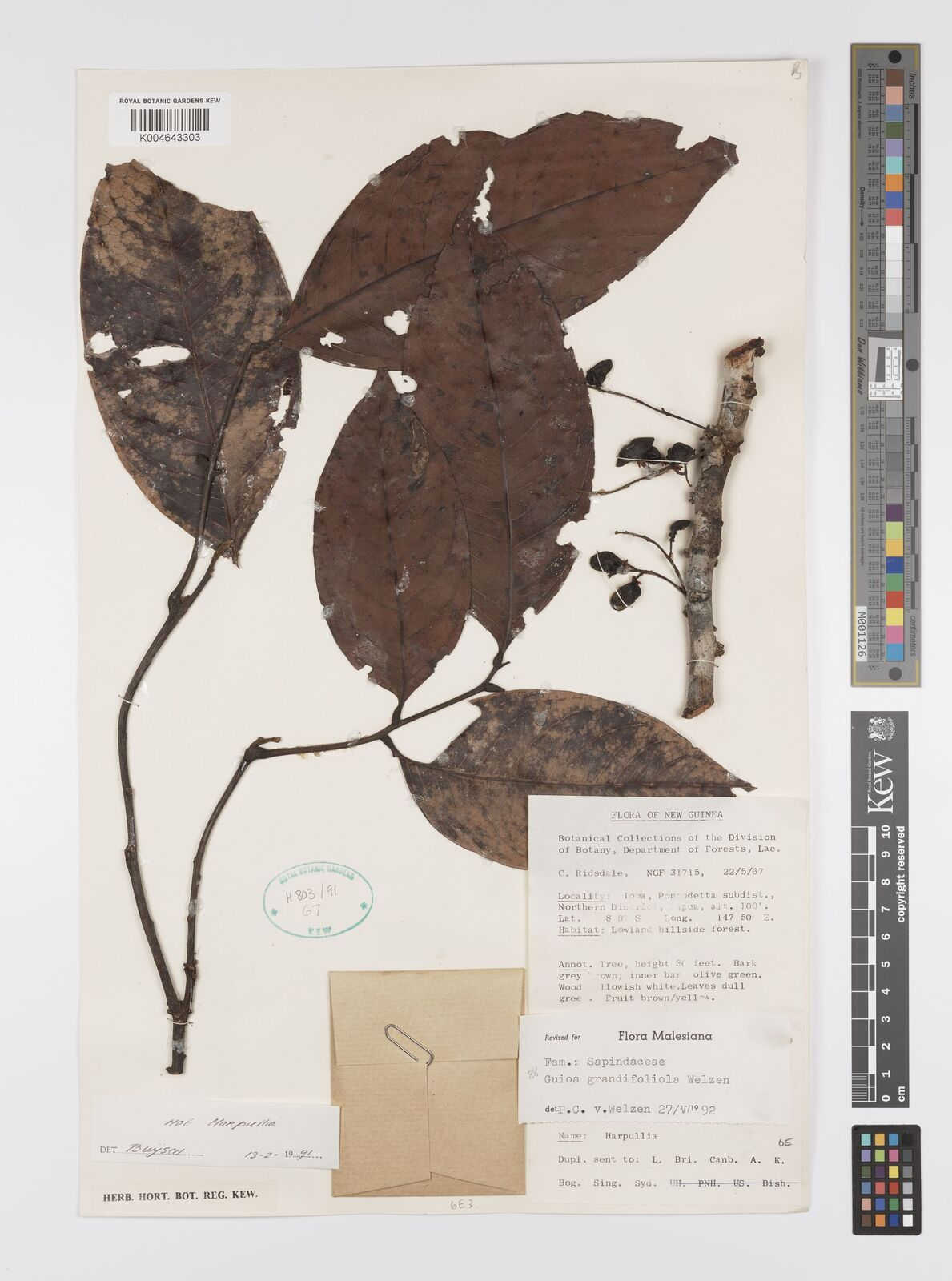

Conservation status
- Endangered (IUCN 3.1)

Scientific classification
- Kingdom: Plantae
- Clade: Tracheophytes
- Clade: Angiosperms
- Clade: Eudicots
- Clade: Rosids
- Order: Sapindales
- Family: Sapindaceae
- Genus: Guioa
- Species: G. grandifoliola

Binomial name
- Guioa grandifoliola Welzen

= Guioa grandifoliola =

Species of tree

Guioa grandifoliola is a species of plant in the family Sapindaceae. It is endemic to Papua New Guinea.
