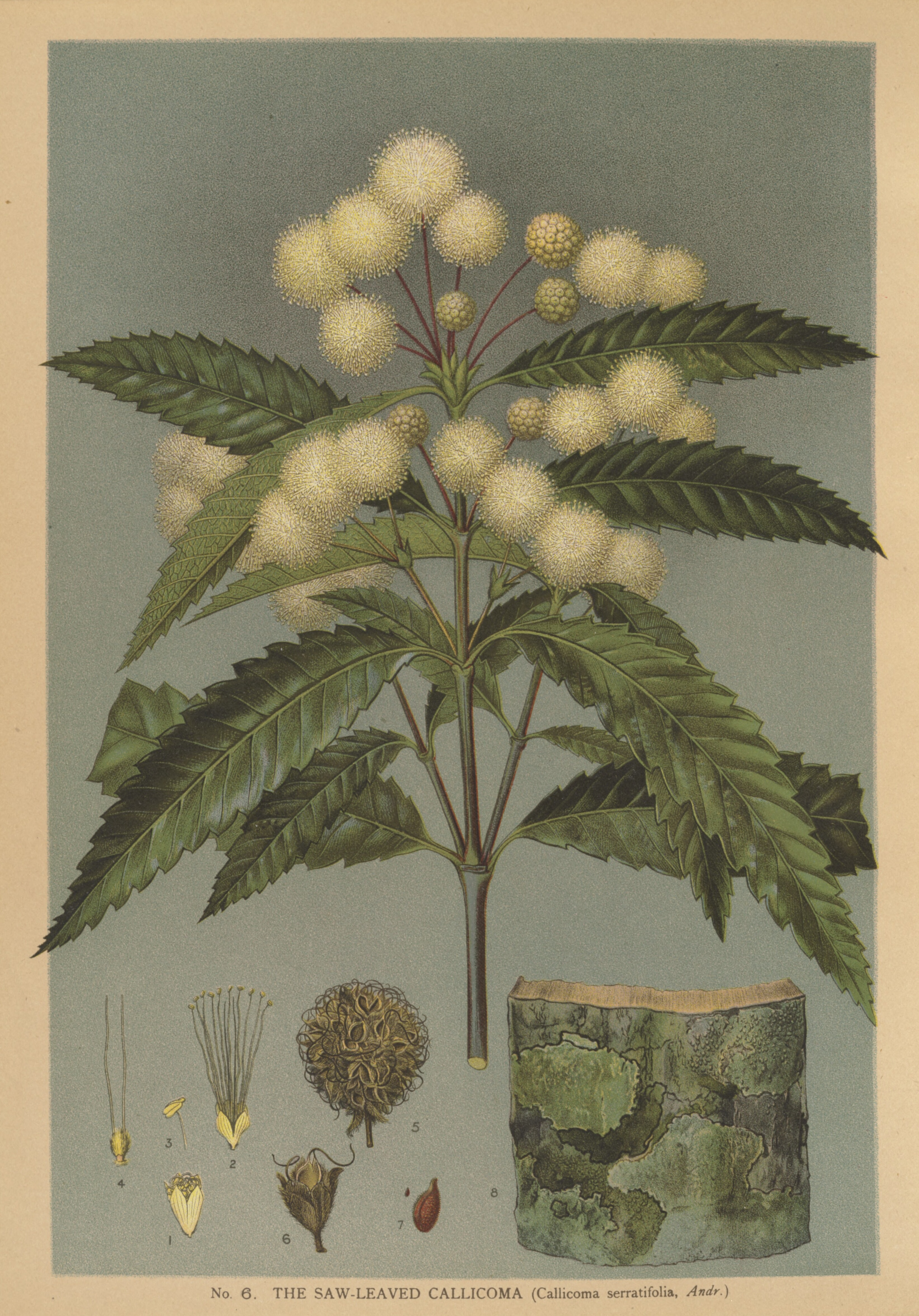
- An 1895 illustration by Edward Minchen

Conservation status
- Least Concern (IUCN 3.1)

Scientific classification
- Kingdom: Plantae
- Clade: Tracheophytes
- Clade: Angiosperms
- Clade: Eudicots
- Clade: Rosids
- Order: Oxalidales
- Family: Cunoniaceae
- Genus: Callicoma; Andrews
- Species: C. serratifolia

Binomial name
- Callicoma serratifolia Andrews

Synonyms
- Calycomis R.Br.; Callicoma ferruginea D.Don; Callicoma serratifolia f. ferruginea (D.Don) Pamp.; Callicoma serratifolium var. ferruginea (D.Don) Pamp.; Codia serratifolia Ser. ex DC., pro syn.; Hermesia banksiifolia Spreng.

= Callicoma =

Genus of trees

Callicoma is a plant genus that contains just one species, Callicoma serratifolia, a tall shrub or small tree native to Australia. Callicoma serratifolia is commonly known as black wattle. One explanation for the name is the similarity of the flowers to those of Australian Acacia, which are commonly known as wattles. Another explanation is its use in wattle and daub huts of the early settlers. The species has a number of other common names include callicoma, butterwood, silver leaf, silver-leaf butterwood and wild quince.

== Description ==
Black wattle can grow up to 20 metres in height, though in cultivation it is more likely to reach a height of between 6 and 10 m with a 3-metre spread. It has lanceolate or elliptic leaves that grow up to 12 cm long and 5 cm wide with coarsely serrate margins. The upper side of the leaves are dark green, while the lower sides are white due to the presence of fine, white hairs. The pale-yellow globular flower heads appear in late spring and early summer (November to December in Australia). These average 1.5 cm in diameter and have 1 to 2 cm long stalks.

== Taxonomy ==
The first published description of the species in 1809 is attributed to Henry Cranke Andrews.

== Distribution ==
It occurs within and on the edges of rainforest in near-coastal areas within New South Wales and southeast Queensland, mostly along drainage lines or near creeks.

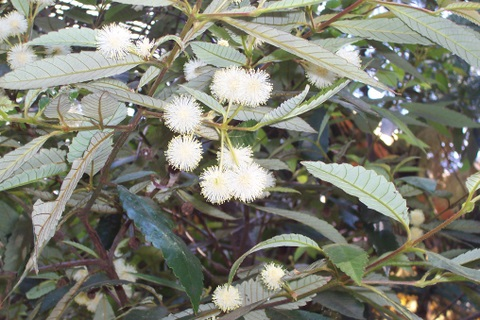
Flowers and leaves, Elvina Bay, New South Wales
