= Quincy House, Riyadh =

Building in Riyadh, Saudi Arabia

Quincy House is the official residence of the U.S. Ambassador to Saudi Arabia, and is located in Riyadh.

== History ==
Quincy House is located in the Diplomatic Quarter, on the northeast side of Riyadh, and is named in honor of an historic meeting that took place at the close of World War II between U.S. President Franklin D. Roosevelt and King Abdul Aziz, the founder of the modern state of Saudi Arabia. The meeting occurred aboard the naval vessel USS Quincy, operating on the Great Bitter Lake, just outside the Suez Canal, on February 14, 1945, and it was the first time the Saudi monarch left his native land. There are many pictures and videos of this historic meeting, which took place shortly before Roosevelt's death.

In 1995, to commemorate 50 years since the meeting occurred, then-U.S. Ambassador Ray Mabus unveiled a detailed model of the meeting on the USS Quincy, paid for with private donations, and this model is still on display today at Quincy House.

== Quincy House today ==
In addition to its use as a residence for the U.S. ambassador and his or her family, the house is opened from time-to-time for official embassy functions.
