= Quincey =

Quincey may refer to:

== People ==
- Colin Quincey (1945-2018), trans-Tasman rower
- James Quincey (born 1965), CEO of The Coca Cola Company
- Kyle Quincey (born 1985), Canadian ice hockey player
- Thomas de Quincey (1785–1859), English author and intellectual

== Fictional characters ==
- Quincey Morris, an American character in Bram Stoker's horror novel Dracula

== Places ==
- Quincey, Côte-d'Or, France
- Quincey, Haute-Saône, France
- Ferreux-Quincey, Aube, France

== See also ==
- Quincy (disambiguation)
