= Basis Set Ventures =

American venture capital firm

Basis Set Builders, LLC
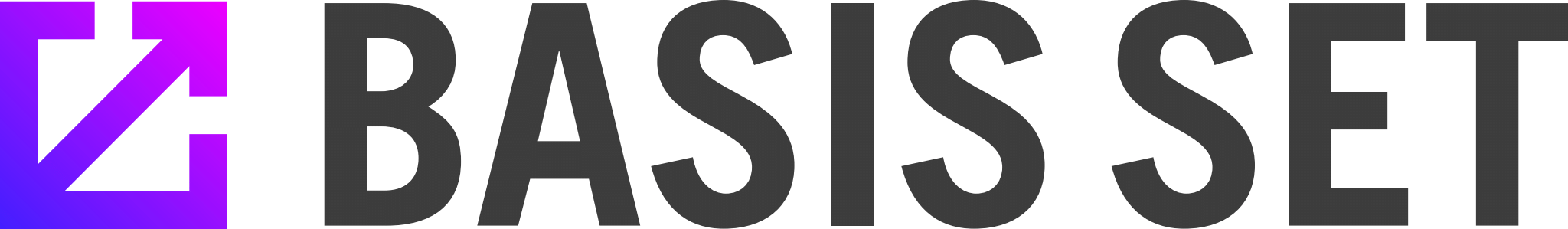
- Trade name: Basis Set
- Type: Private
- Industry: Venture capital
- Founded: June 23, 2017; 9 years ago
- Founder: Lan Xuezhao
- Headquarters: San Francisco, California, United States
- AUM: US$850 million (2026)
- Number of employees: 10 (2026)
- Website: www.basisset.com

Basis Set Ventures is an American venture capital firm that was one of the earliest to specialize in investing in early-stage startups building with artificial intelligence. The firm is based in San Francisco, California. As of 2026, the firm had $850 million in assets under management.

== History ==
Basis Set Ventures was founded in 2017 by Lan Xuezhao. Lan previously led Corporate Development at Dropbox and advised technology clients at McKinsey & Company. Lan is a founder and angel investor in companies including Scale AI. She has a M.A. in Statistics and PhD in psychology from the University of Michigan.

Basis Set Ventures announced its first fund in August 2017. The firm announced its $165M second fund in April 2021 and its $185M third fund in February 2024. Basis Set's latest $250M Fund IV was announced in January 2026. While Basis Set's LPs have not been disclosed, Foundry and Melinda French Gates’ Pivotal Ventures have both been publicly named as investors in the fund. According to TIME, Basis Set Ventures was included among America's top venture capital firms in 2026.

== Notable investments ==
- Quince
- Sakana
- CuspAI
- OpenArt
- DataGrail
- Drata
- Path
- Ergeon

== Technology and research in investment strategy ==
Basis Set Ventures leverages machine learning and proprietary software to support investment sourcing and analysis.

The firm conducts research on applying large-scale data and AI models to venture decision-making, including studies using large language models (LLMs) to predict startup success and explore founder psychology.
