= Quince Orchard =

Quince Orchard may refer to:

- Quince Orchard, Maryland, an unincorporated area and neighborhood of Gaithersburg, Maryland
- Quince Orchard Road, part of Maryland Route 124
- Quince Orchard High School, a high school on Quince Orchard Road

== See also ==
- Quince
