= USS Quincy =

Three United States Navy ships have been named USS Quincy, after the city of Quincy, Massachusetts.

- USS Quincy (AK-10) was a German cargo ship seized during World War I.
- USS Quincy (CA-39) was a heavy cruiser, sunk during World War II.
- USS Quincy (CA-71) was a heavy cruiser, named to commemorate CA-39.
