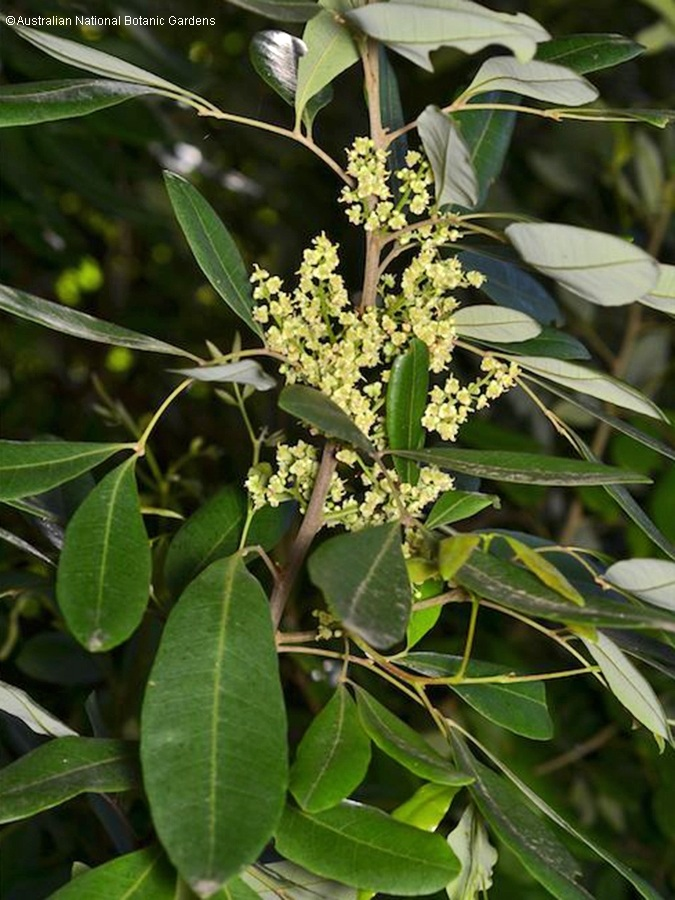
- Foliage and flowers

Conservation status
- Least Concern (NCA)

Scientific classification
- Kingdom: Plantae
- Clade: Tracheophytes
- Clade: Angiosperms
- Clade: Eudicots
- Clade: Rosids
- Order: Sapindales
- Family: Sapindaceae
- Genus: Guioa
- Species: G. semiglauca

Binomial name
- Guioa semiglauca (F.Muell.) Radlk.

Synonyms
- Aytera semiglauca F.Muell.; Cupania semiglauca F.Muell. ex Benth.; Nephelium semiglaucum (F.Muell.) F.Muell.

= Guioa semiglauca =

Species of tree

Guioa semiglauca, known as the guioa or wild quince, is a rainforest tree of eastern Australia It grows from Kioloa (35° S) near Batemans Bay in southern New South Wales to Eungella National Park (20° S) in tropical Queensland. It grows in many different types of rainforest, particularly common in regenerating areas and on sand in littoral rainforest.

== Description ==
Guioa semiglauca grows to around 25 m tall and 43 cm in diameter, but it may flower and fruit when only 6 m tall. The outer bark is smooth and the trunk is fluted. It is similar to coachwood, however it is more fluted and irregular.

The veiny leaflets are pinnate and measure up to 10 cm long. The midrib extends beyond the leaf to form a tiny tip. They are green above and whitish (glaucous) below. The yellow/green flowers form around September to November. The fruiting capsule matures from January to May. The seeds are oval covered by a thin layer of fleshy aril. Fruit eaten by a large variety of birds, including the Australian king parrot.

== Uses ==
Indigenous Australians used the saponin in the bark as a fish poison.

== Gallery ==
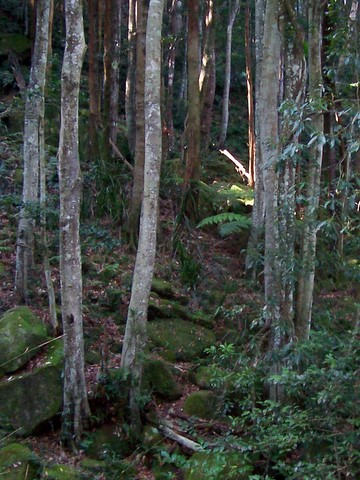
Stand of trees on the Illawarra Escarpment south west of Kiama

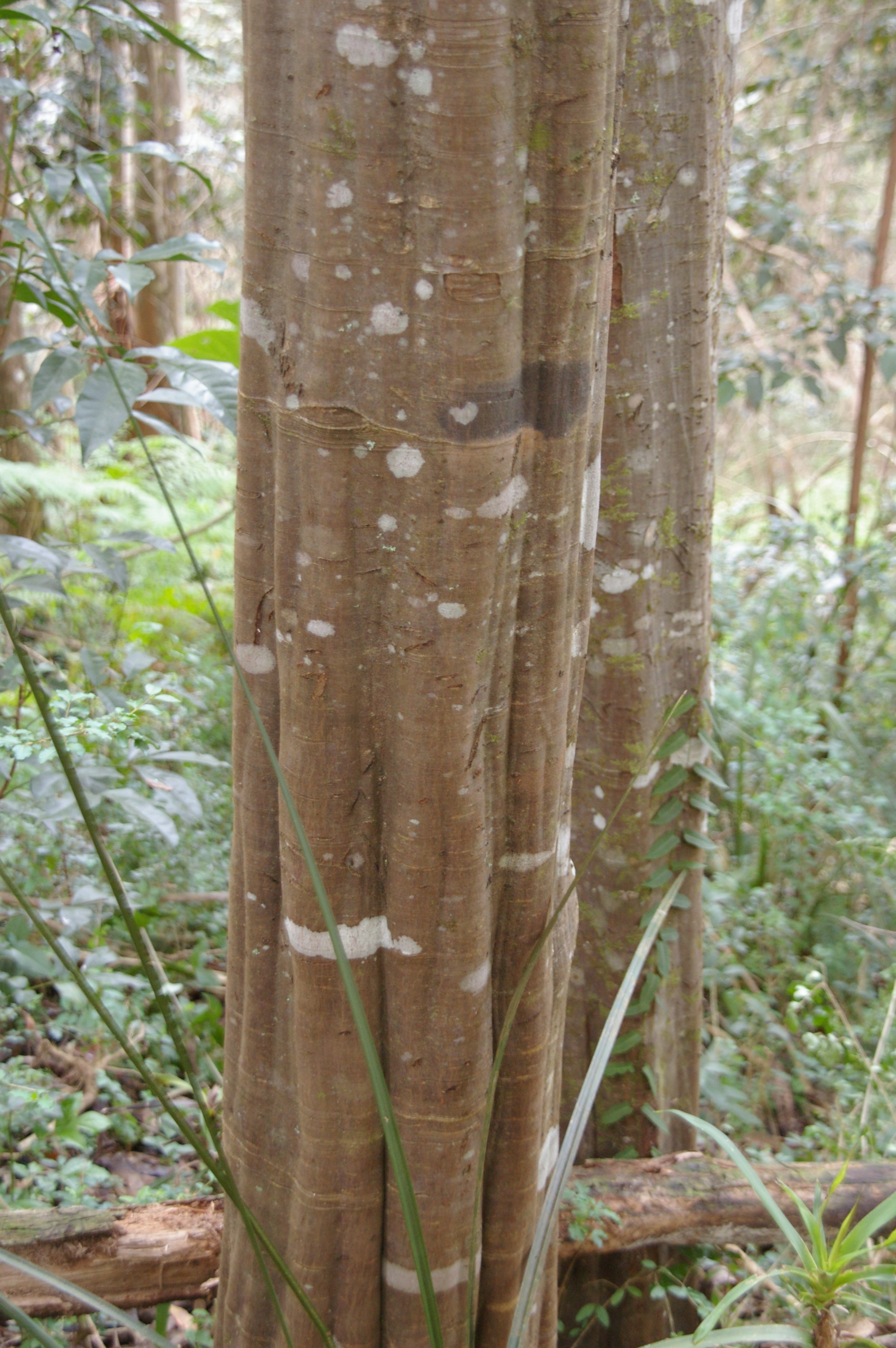
Fluted trunk

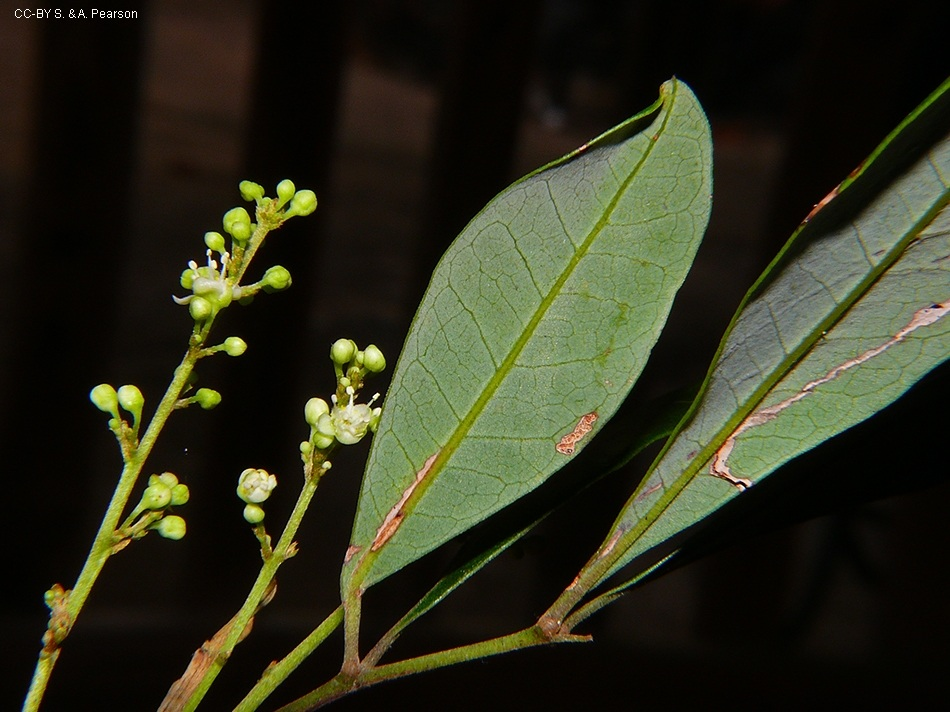
Underside of leaves

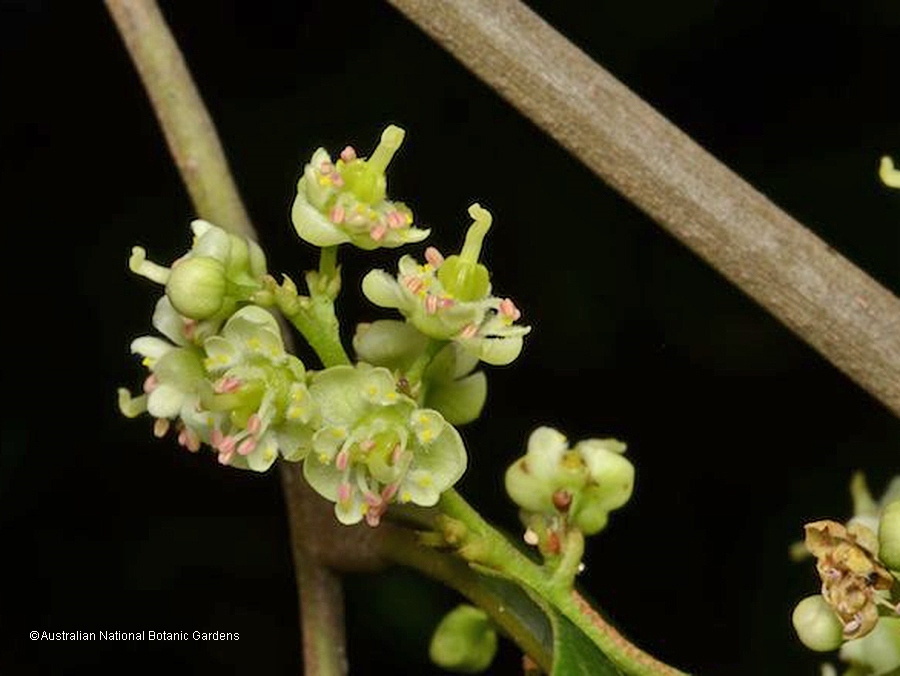
Female flowers

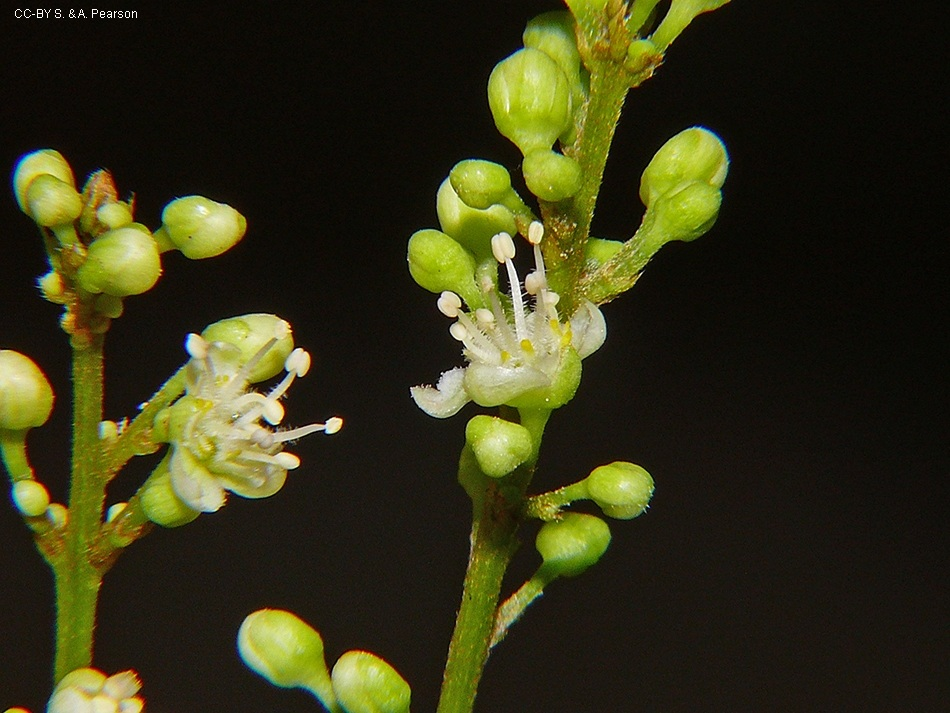
Male flowers

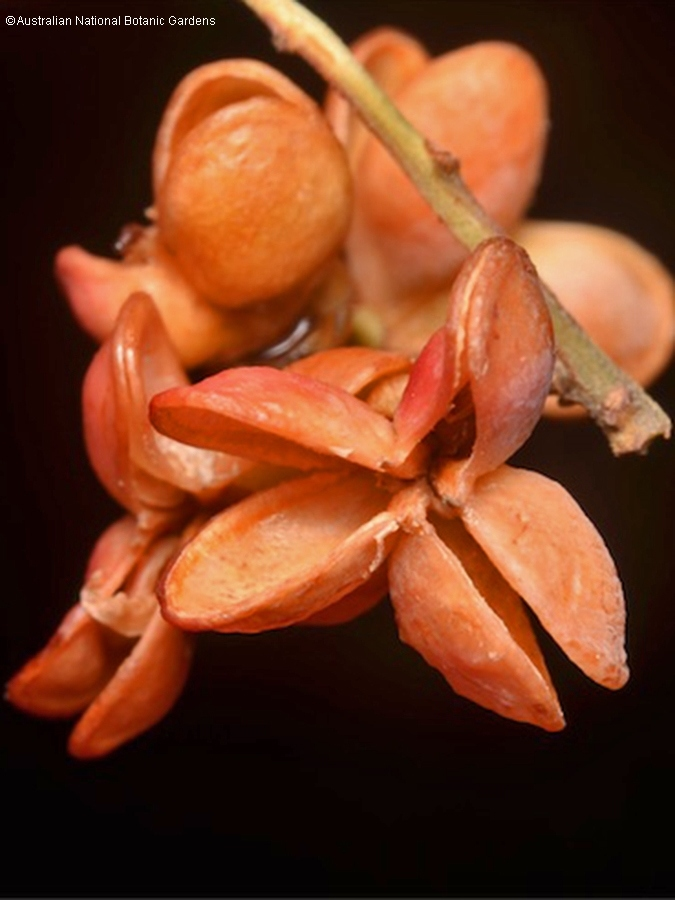
Fruit
