= Catatos =

Angolan fried caterpillar dish

Catatos is a traditional Angolan dish made with fried caterpillars and garlic. It is often served over rice. The dish is a specialty of the Uíge Province in northwestern Angola.

== Background ==
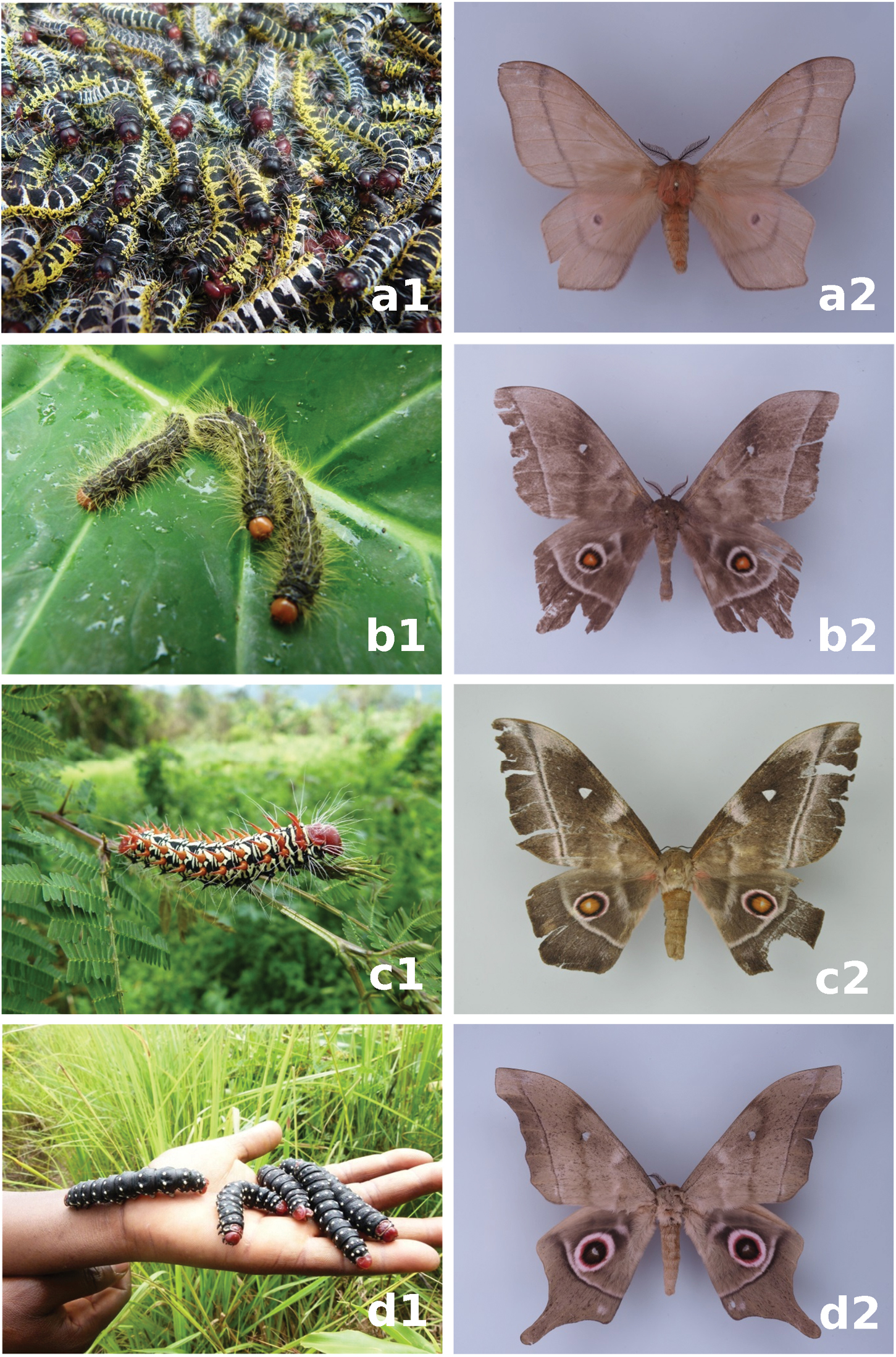
Larval (left) and adult (right) forms of edible moths from Northern Angola: (in descending order) Cirina forda, Imbrasia epimethea, Imbrasia obscura, Imbrasia truncata.

The consumption of insects is an ancient indigenous tradition in many parts of the world, including southern Africa, due to their high nutritious value. A number of edible insects, including caterpillars and other larvae, are eaten in the Uíge Province of Angola where they play a substantial role in rural diet. Of these, the mopane worm (Gonimbrasia belina), a type of caterpillar, is one of the most widely consumed species. Approximately 9.5 billion mopane worms are harvested yearly in southern Africa. Other caterpillar species traditionally eaten in Angola include the larvae of the Imbrasia epimethea, Imbrasia ertli and Usta terpsichore.

Traditional methods of gathering and preparation vary depending on the species. Children are often sent to gather them from the trees, while adults gather them in the fields. Sometimes, trees may be cut down and split to gather the caterpillars inside. Caterpillars are washed in water, and their digestive tract may be removed as part of the cleaning process. Urticating hairs are singed off, if present. Catatos, a traditional Uíge dish, is made by frying caterpillars with garlic.

== Preparation ==
The caterpillars are fried together with garlic. Other ingredients, such as onion, tomatoes and pepper may be added for flavoring. The caterpillars take on a tender yet crunchy texture, and their taste has been compared to prawns. It is usually served over funge. Hot sauce may also be added.

== Nutritional value ==
Caterpillars are high in protein, vitamins and minerals, including iron. A study published in 2017 found that Imbrasia epimethea larvae had a comparable amount of protein to tuna, chicken and beef, but lower levels of essential amino acids. They are rich in polyunsaturated fatty acids. The study also found that cooking did not significantly impact nutritional value, making them a viable alternative to traditional meats. Mopane caterpillars have 31 mg of iron per 100 g of dry weight, compared to 6 mg of iron per 100 g of dry weight for beef.
