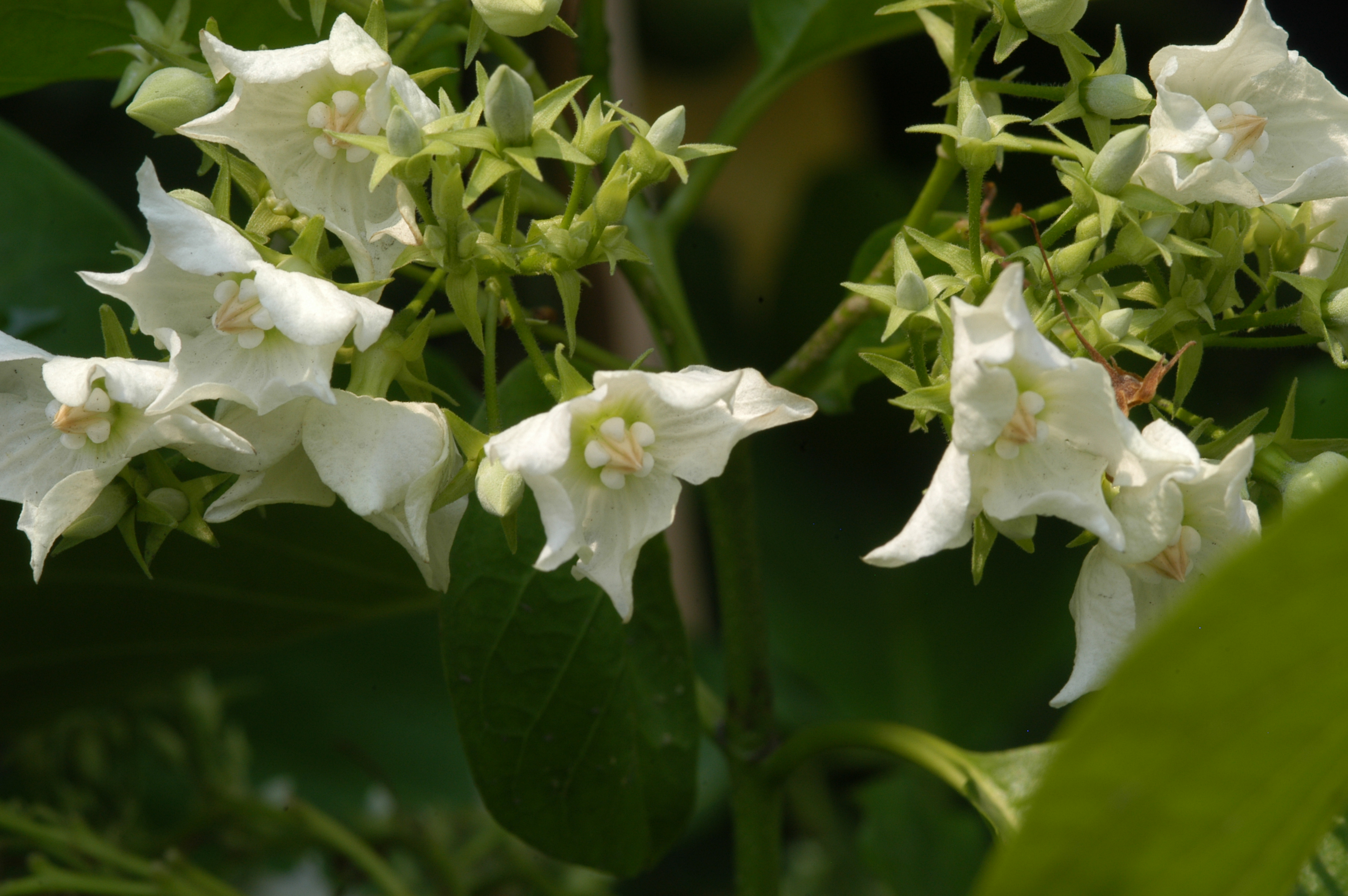
- Vallaris glabra

Scientific classification
- Kingdom: Plantae
- Clade: Tracheophytes
- Clade: Angiosperms
- Clade: Eudicots
- Clade: Asterids
- Order: Gentianales
- Family: Apocynaceae
- Subfamily: Apocynoideae
- Tribe: Apocyneae
- Genus: Vallaris; Burm.f. 1768

Synonyms
- Emericia Roem. & Schult.; Peltanthera Roth nom. rej; Parabeaumontia (Baill.) Pichon

= Vallaris =

Genus of plants

Vallaris is a genus of plants in the family Apocynaceae first described as a genus in 1768. It is native to China, the Indian subcontinent, and Southeast Asia.

Species

- Vallaris glabra (L.) Kuntze – bread flower, kesidang (Malay) – Java, Flores, Sumatra; naturalized in W Malaysia, Thailand, Christmas Island
- Vallaris indecora (Baill.) Tsiang & P.T.Li – Guangxi, Guizhou, Sichuan, Yunnan
- Vallaris solanacea (Roth) Kuntze – India, Sri Lanka, Pakistan, Nepal, Bhutan, Bangladesh, Cambodia, Laos, Myanmar, Thailand, Vietnam, Hainan; naturalized in Andaman Islands

formerly included

1. Vallaris anceps = Kibatalia macrophylla
2. Vallaris angustifolia = Kibatalia gitingensis
3. Vallaris arborea = Kibatalia macrophylla
4. Vallaris clavata = Echites clavatus
5. Vallaris daronensis = Kibatalia maingayi
6. Vallaris divaricata = Strophanthus divaricatus
7. Vallaris fimbriata = Euphorbia mammillaris
8. Vallaris gitingensis = Kibatalia gitingensis
9. Vallaris ipecacuanhae = Euphorbia ipecacuanhae
10. Vallaris lancifolia = Micrechites lancifolius
11. Vallaris laxiflora = Pottsia laxiflora
12. Vallaris macrantha = Beaumontia macrantha
13. Vallaris maingayi = Kibatalia maingayi
14. Vallaris missurica = Euphorbia missurica
15. Vallaris portulacoides = Euphorbia portulacoides
16. Vallaris × uniflora = Euphorbia × uniflora
