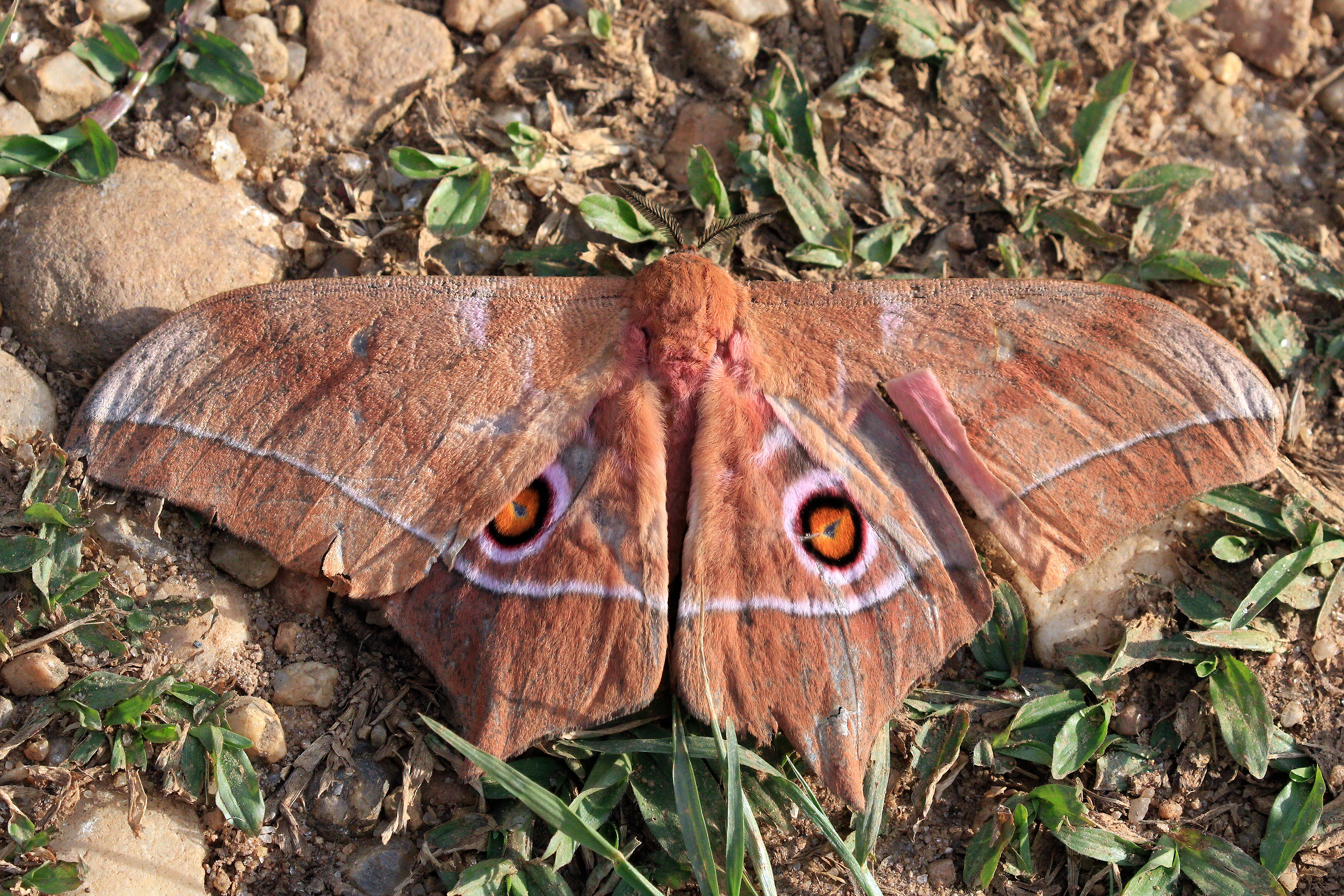

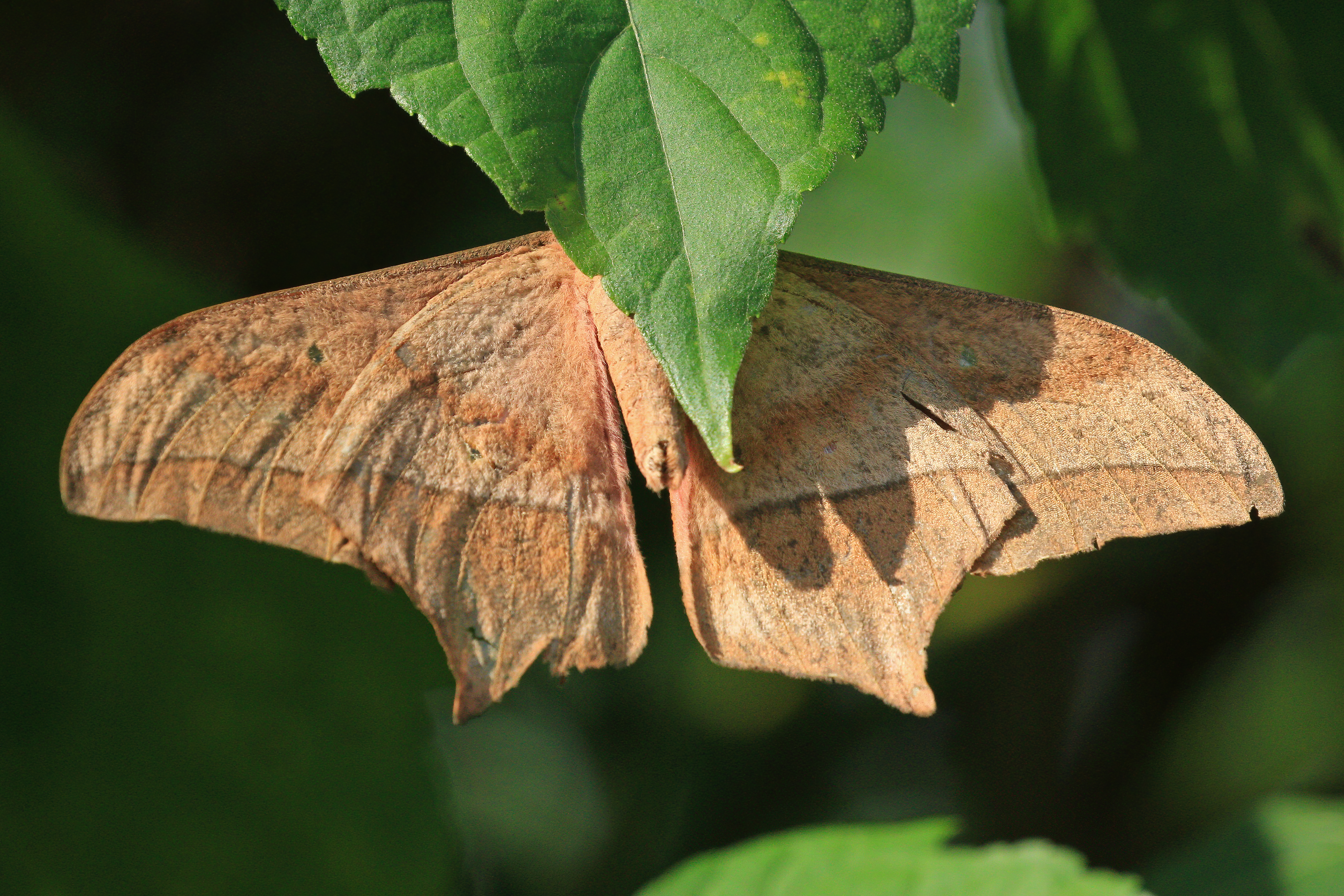
- In Uganda

Scientific classification
- Domain: Eukaryota
- Kingdom: Animalia
- Phylum: Arthropoda
- Class: Insecta
- Order: Lepidoptera
- Family: Saturniidae
- Genus: Imbrasia
- Species: I. epimethea

Binomial name
- Imbrasia epimethea (Drury, 1773)

Synonyms
- Phalaena epimethea Drury, 1773; Imbrasia crameri Kirby, 1892; Imbrasia diomede Karsch, 1893; Bunaea dorcas Walker, 1855; Eacles epimedea Herrich-Schäffer, 1855; Imbrasia nadari Bouvier, 1928; Bombyx nictitans Fabricius, 1775; Imbrasia paradoxa Dufrane, 1953

= Imbrasia epimethea =

Species of moth

Imbrasia epimethea is a species of moth belonging to the family Saturniidae. It was first described by Dru Drury in 1773 from the Calabar coast.

== Description ==
Upper side: antennae strongly pectinated; the extremities appearing like threads. Thorax light brown, tinged with red. Abdomen grey brown. Anterior wings light grey brown, tinged with red at the base; having a narrow dark-coloured bar verged with grey running from the anterior to the posterior edges, parallel and at a little distance from the external margin. Posterior wings grey brown, terminating behind in points like acute angles; a dark narrow bar, edged with white, crosses these wings from the upper corners to the abdominal edges, dividing them into two compartments; in the uppermost of which are placed two eyes, whose centres are yellow, surrounded with black irides edged with red, and which also are encircled with ash-coloured rings. Above these eyes the wings are dark-coloured, almost black; but next the body are of a reddish hue.

Under side: legs black. Thorax and abdomen same colour as on the upper side. Wings nearly the same colour as on the upper side; the bars being plain and distinct, but the eyes are not observable here.

Drury's text does not state the wingspan, but his figure shows it as 5 inches (127mm).

== Distribution ==
It is found in Angola, Cameroon, the Republic of Congo, the Democratic Republic of Congo (Bas Congo, Katanga, Orientale), Equatorial Guinea, Gabon, Ghana, Guinea, Guinea-Bissau, Ivory Coast, Kenya, Mozambique, Nigeria, Sierra Leone, Tanzania, Togo and Uganda.

== Biology ==
The larvae are highly gregarious and feed on Theobroma cacao, Petersianthus africanus, Petersianthus macrocarpus, Holarrhena floribunda, Funtumia species (including Funtumia africana and Funtumia elastica), Ricinodendron heudelotii, Acacia lahai, Terminalia, Bauhinia and Anona senegalensis.

== Subspecies ==
- Imbrasia epimethea epimethea
- Imbrasia epimethea biokoensis Darge, 1988
