= Moqueca =

Brazilian seafood stew

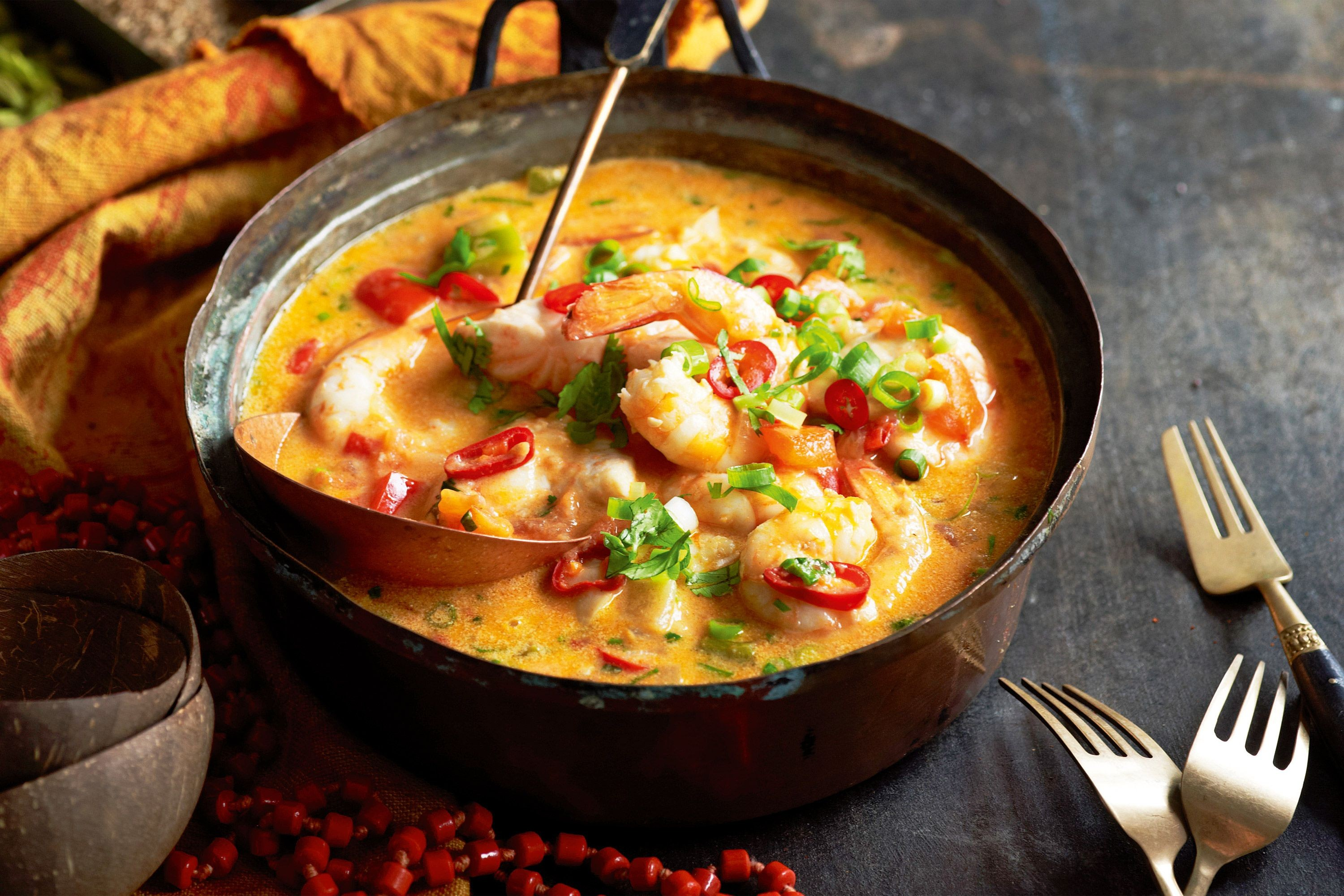
- Moqueca made with shrimp, cilantro, and red bell peppers.
- Type: soup
- Place of origin: Brazil
- Main ingredients: Seafood, tomatoes, onions, lime, coriander
- Variations: Moqueca capixaba, moqueca baiana, moqueca paraense

Moqueca (IPA: [moˈkɛkɐ] or IPA: [muˈkɛkɐ] depending on the dialect, also spelled muqueca) is a Brazilian seafood stew. Moqueca is typically made with shrimp or fish in a base of tomatoes, onions, garlic, lime, and coriander. Some recipes include annatto, palm oil, and coconut milk, depending on the regional variation.

The dish and its countless variations are present in the cuisine of several Brazilian states and compete for the position of national culinary symbol – in 2013, in a promotional survey by the Ministry of Tourism, it was chosen as the archetypical recipe that could not be missed on a tourist's table, even displacing feijoada. According to Luís da Câmara Cascudo, author of History of Food in Brazil (Global), the fish that the Indians baked wrapped in leaves was called pokeka. Just like the word, which made “make a wrap”, the dish was gradually transformed, taking on the way of cooking in each place. In Bahia, where African influence prevailed, coconut milk and palm oil became mandatory ingredients – dorado, shark, whiting and sea bass are the most used fish. In the Espírito Santo version, Caloca Fernandes, author of Gastronomic journey through Brazil (Senac-SP), sees a purer aspect of Portuguese stews. In moqueca from Pará, an Amazonian fish that is accompanied by tucupi, jambu and shrimp. In Manaus, versions based on freshwater fish such as pirarucu and sorubim also prevail.

Regardless of region, cooking in a ceramic pan is often seen as an essential part of the dish, as it is capable of retaining heat and keeping the broth steaming for longer. In Espírito Santo, the subject is taken so seriously that it has become a heritage site – the Ofício das Paneleiras de Goiabeiras, a neighborhood in Vitória, was registered as a cultural asset by the National Historical and Artistic Heritage Institute (Iphan) in 2002. To this day, these ceramic pans are often made with clay from the region according to the indigenous technique: after being modeled by hand, they receive dye made from red mangrove bark, and are burned in the open air. The raw material used goes beyond keeping the moqueca hot. “This type of clay reduces the acidity of tomatoes and peppers, which is why moqueca from Espírito Santo does not cause heartburn”, guarantees Paulo Cesar Casagrande, owner of the Meaípe restaurant in São Paulo. At Meaípe, the Capixaba whiting moqueca is served on the table with rice and pirão. “The Bahian makes the pirão like the Indians: he puts the broth on the plate and throws the raw flour on top. We do it like the Portuguese: first we hydrate the flour in cold water and only then add the broth. As the raw flour ferments in the belly, the Bahian pirão is heavier,” explains Paulo.

== Origins ==
The dish's origins are unclear. It resembles a Portuguese pre-colonial dish, but modern versions call for African ingredients such as palm oil and coconut milk brought to the region by Portuguese slave traders.

== Ingredients ==
=== Bahia ===
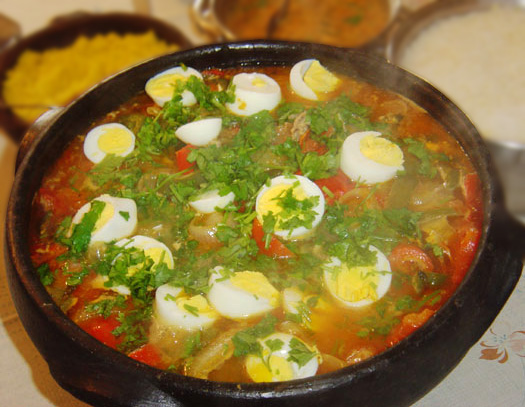
Moqueca baiana topped with eggs and chopped cilantro.

Moqueca baiana was developed in the state of Bahia, Brazil. It was further influenced by African and Portuguese cuisines by adding dendê palm oil, coconut milk, and peppers. Traditional ingredients remain the same, with the dish typically garnished with chopped coriander, then served with rice and farofa.

=== Espirito Santo ===
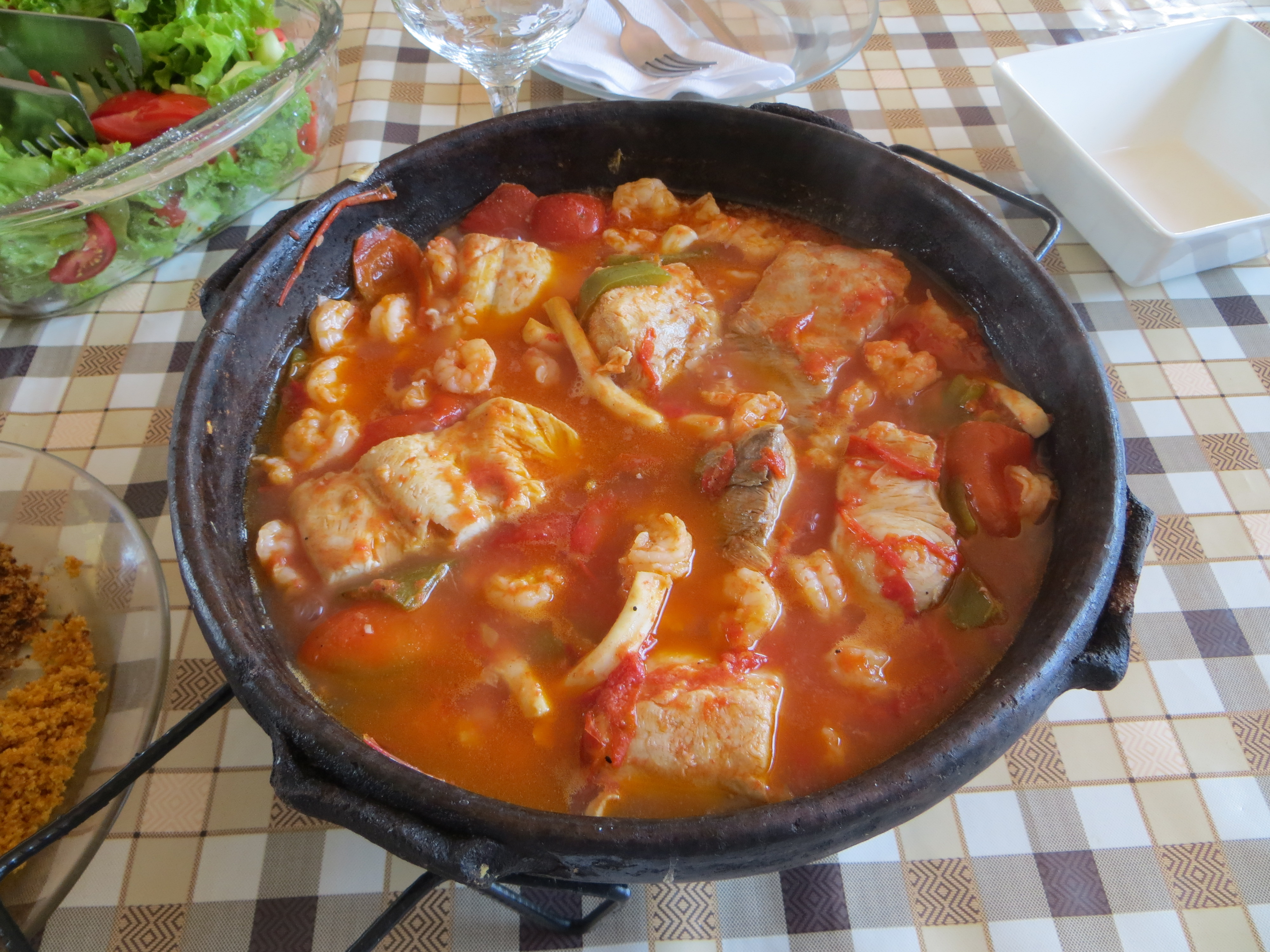
A home-made moqueca from Espírito Santo in a clay pot.

Moqueca capixaba is native to the state of Espírito Santo. It is a combination of Brazilian and Portuguese cuisine. It is considered a softer and lighter version of moqueca. Lighter oils, such as extra-virgin olive oil, are used instead of palm oil (as in the Bahian version). Annatto is typically an ingredient. Peppers are generally not included.

Urucum pigment is added, and it is always cooked in a traditional clay pan. Moqueca capixaba can be made with fish, shrimp, crabs, sea crabs or lobsters.

== Preparation and serving ==
The full meal set includes banana da terra (plantain) stew as a side dish as well as pirão and white rice - each one in its own clay pan. The dish is usually seasoned with onion, tomatoes, coriander, and chives. It is usually accompanied by pirão, which is the paste made with cassava root flour ("farinha de mandioca") and the gravy from the stew.

Capixaba pans, especially panelas de barro, are made with black clay and glazed with mangrove tree sap. After being shaped and fired, sap is re-applied. This blackens the clay and makes it water resistant. The pan must be seasoned with oil a couple of times before use.

These cassole pans are very important to Vitória, and the city is home to a grassroots organization of pan-makers known as Associação das Paneleiras de Goiabeiras.

== Variations ==
Vegetarian versions, using plantains instead of seafood, are a common variation.

The dish is also known in Angola; Angolan moqueca is similar to the Bahian version and typically includes palm oil, coconut milk or peppers.

== In popular culture ==
- Moqueca was featured on the Netflix TV series, Street Food volume 2, which focused on Latin American street foods.
- Moqueca was a dish on MasterChef Australia Episode 8.

== See also ==
- List of Brazilian dishes
- List of casserole dishes
- List of stews
