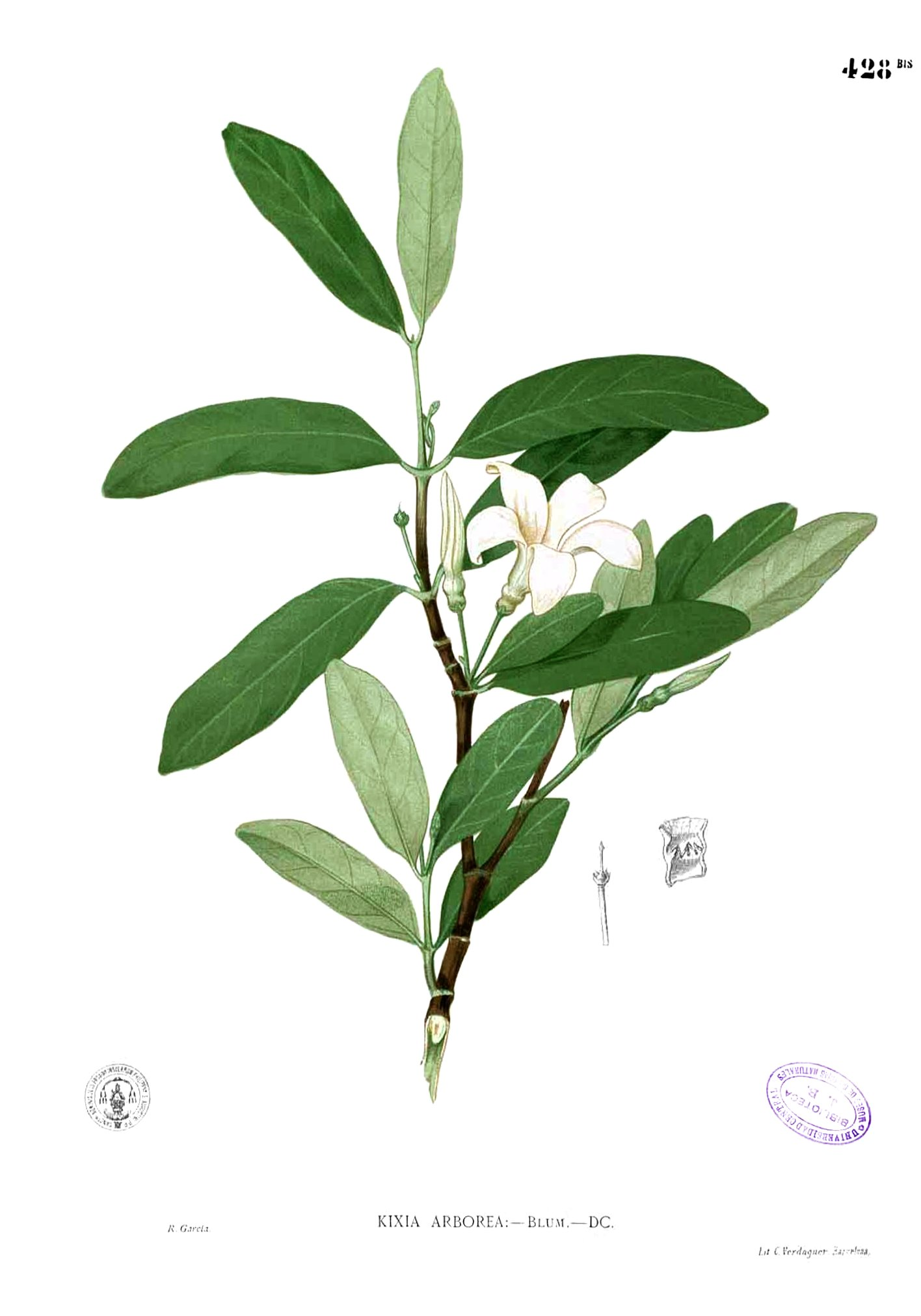
- Kibatalia arborea

Scientific classification
- Kingdom: Plantae
- Clade: Tracheophytes
- Clade: Angiosperms
- Clade: Eudicots
- Clade: Asterids
- Order: Gentianales
- Family: Apocynaceae
- Subfamily: Apocynoideae
- Tribe: Malouetieae
- Genus: Kibatalia; G.Don

Synonyms
- Hasseltia Blume 1826 not Kunth 1825; Kixia Blume; Paravallaris Pierre

= Kibatalia =

Genus of plants

Kibatalia is a genus of trees and shrubs in the family Apocynaceae, tribe Malouetieae, first described as a genus in 1826. It was initially called Hasseltia, but this turned out to be an illegitimate homonym (in other words, someone else had already used the name for another plant). So Kibatalia was chosen as a replacement name. Kibatalia is native to China and Southeast Asia.

Species

1. Kibatalia arborea (Blume) G.Don – Thailand, Philippines, W Malaysia, Borneo, Sumatra, Java, Sulawesi
2. Kibatalia blancoi (Rolfe ex Stapf) Merr. – Philippines
3. Kibatalia borneensis (Stapf) Merr. – Sarawak
4. Kibatalia elmeri Woodson – Luzon
5. Kibatalia gitingensis (Elmer) Woodson – Philippines
6. Kibatalia laurifolia (Ridl.) Woodson – Vietnam, Cambodia, Thailand, W Malaysia
7. Kibatalia longifolia Merr. – Mindanao
8. Kibatalia macgregori (Elmer) Woodson – Sibuyan
9. Kibatalia macrophylla (Pierre ex Hua) Woodson – Yunnan, Indochina
10. Kibatalia maingayi (Hook.f.) Woodson – Thailand, W Malaysia, Borneo, Sumatra, Mindanao
11. Kibatalia merrilliana Woodson – Leyte, Samar
12. Kibatalia puberula Merr. – Samar in Philippines
13. Kibatalia stenopetala Merr. – Luzon, Dinagat, Mindanao
14. Kibatalia villosa Rudjiman – W Malaysia, Borneo
15. Kibatalia wigmanii (Koord.) Merr. – Sulawesi

formerly included

1. Kibatalia africana (Benth.) Merr. = Funtumia africana (Benth.) Stapf
2. Kibatalia elastica (Preuss) Merr. = Funtumia elastica (Preuss) Stapf
3. Kibatalia latifolia (Stapf) Merr. = Funtumia africana (Benth.) Stapf
4. Kibatalia scheffieri (K.Schum.) Merr. = Funtumia africana (Benth.) Stapf
5. Kibatalia zenkeri (K.Schum.) Merr. = Funtumia africana (Benth.) Stapf
