= Palm butter =

Palm butter may refer to:

- Palm butter, a rendering of oil palm fruit used for food and cosmetic purposes
- Palm butter, another name for Moambe or Nyembwe, a western Middle African sauce also made of oil palm fruit
- A spread made of palm oil designed to imitate dairy butter
