= Angolan cuisine =

Culinary traditions of Angola

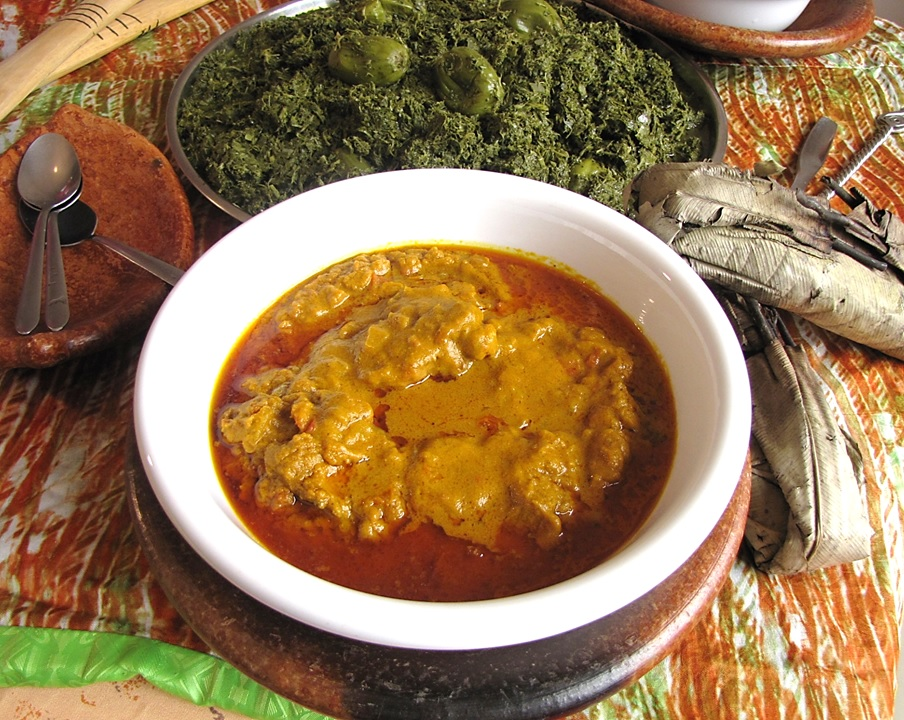
Muamba de Galinha, a national dish in Angola

Angolan cuisine consists of several dishes popular among nationals and foreigners, a fusion of indigenous African and Portuguese influences. These may include funge, mufete (grilled fish, plantain, sweet potato, cassava, and gari), calulu, moamba de galinha, moamba de ginguba, kissaca, and mukua sorbet.

== History ==
Angolan cuisine in its modern shape is a combination of indigenous African ingredients and cooking techniques, and Portuguese influences and ingredients brought over from other Portuguese colonies, such as Brazil.

== Ingredients ==
Staple ingredients include beans and rice, pork and chicken, various sauces, and vegetables such as tomatoes and onions. Spices such as garlic are also frequently seen. Funge, a type of porridge made with cassava, is a staple dish.

There are many influences from Portuguese cuisine like the use of olive oil. Piripiri is a local hot sauce.

== Dishes ==
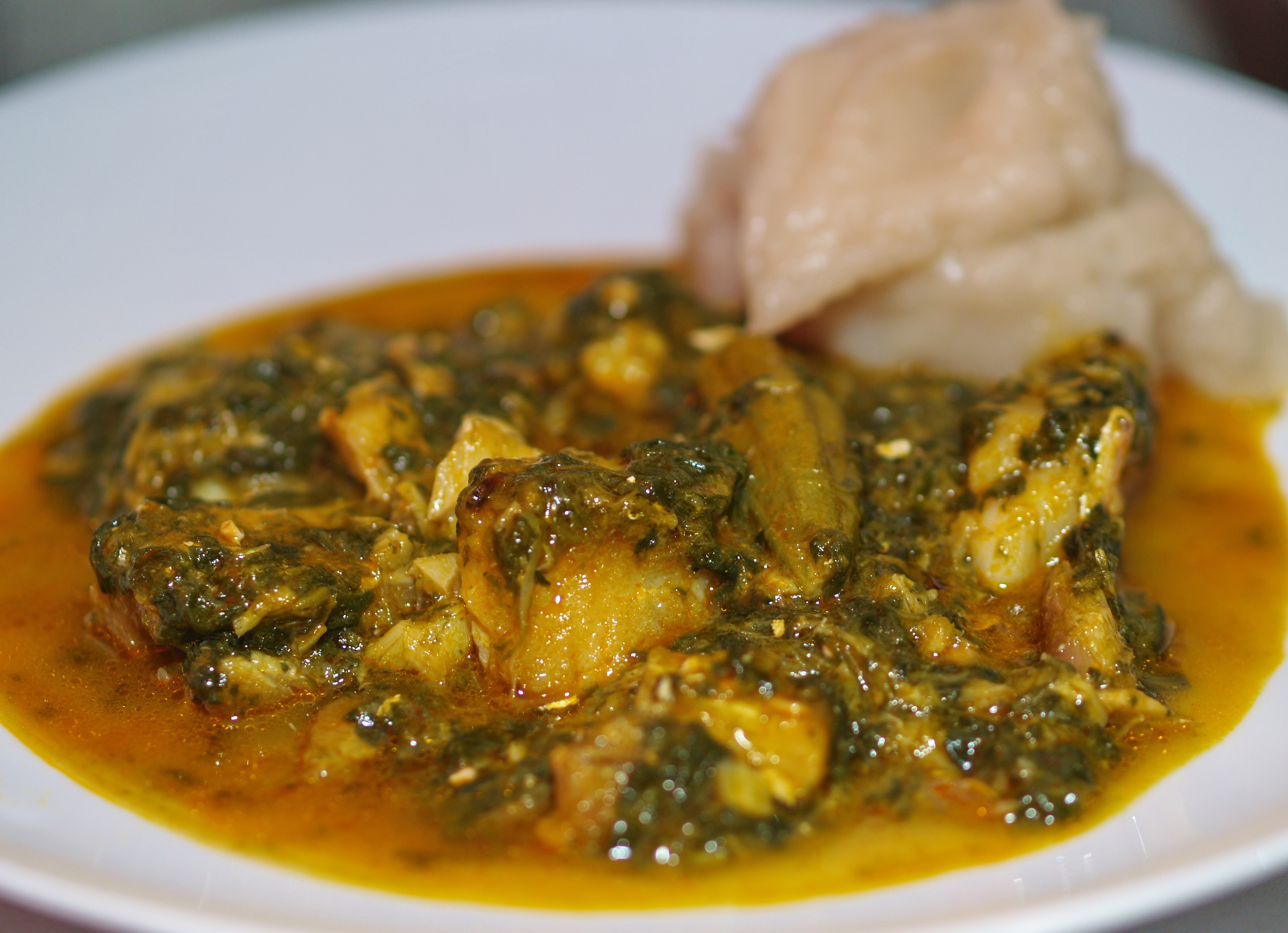
Fish calulu, a typical dish from Angola and São Tomé e Príncipe

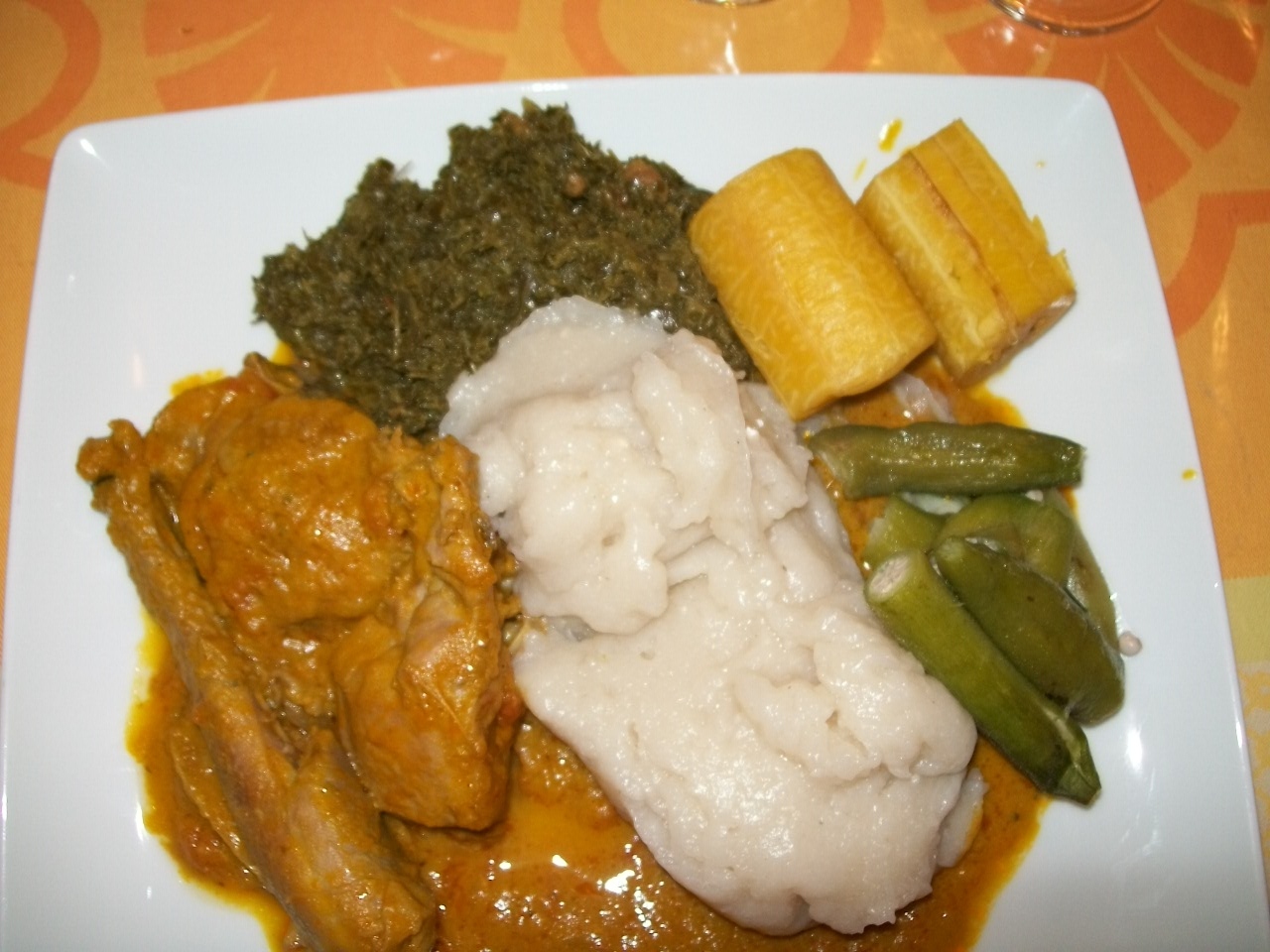
Moamba de galinha, traditional dish of Luanda—palm oil, cassava flour porridge, okra, plantains, wild spinach

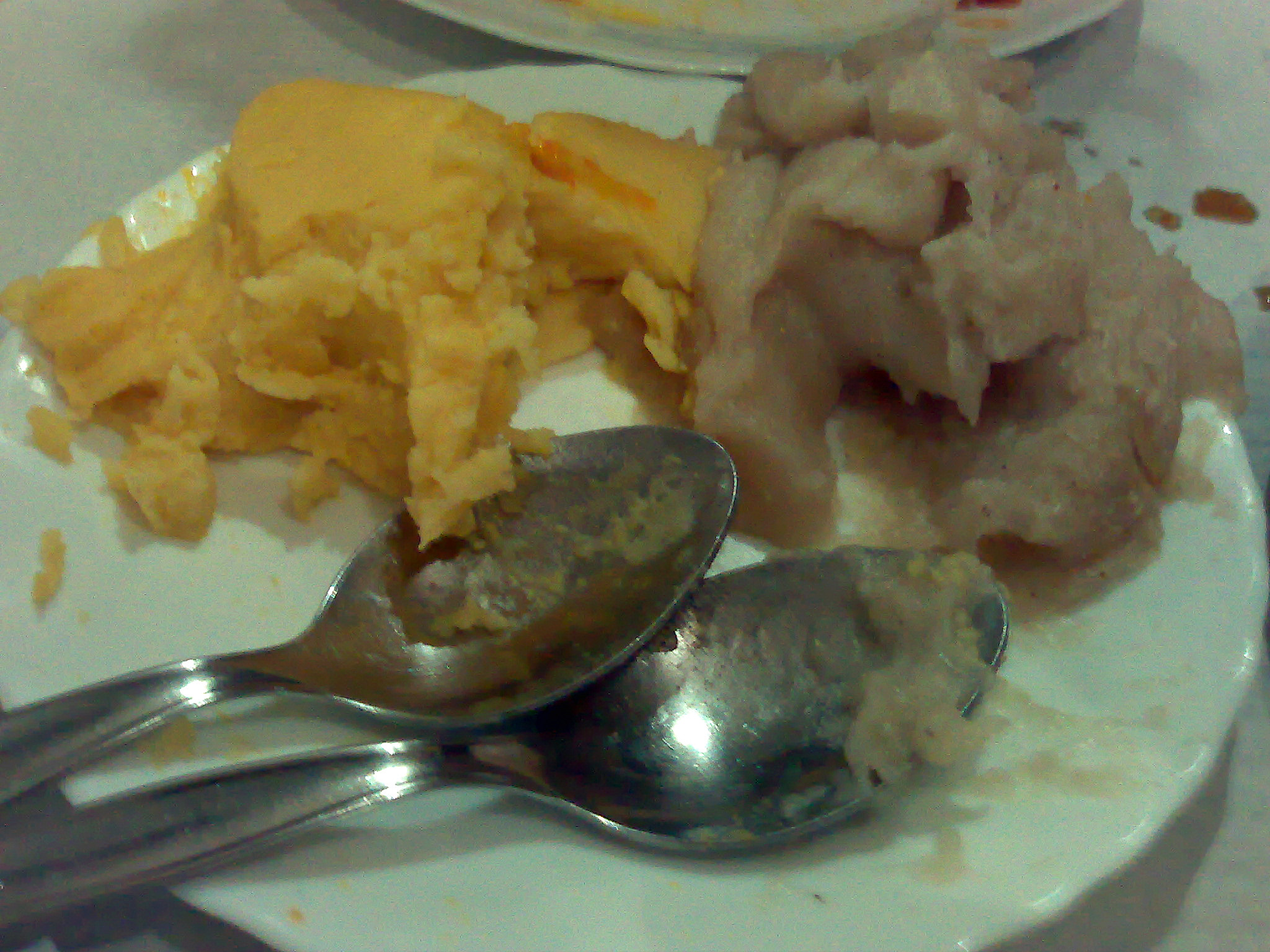
Maize (left) and cassava funge (right), a typical side dish in Angola

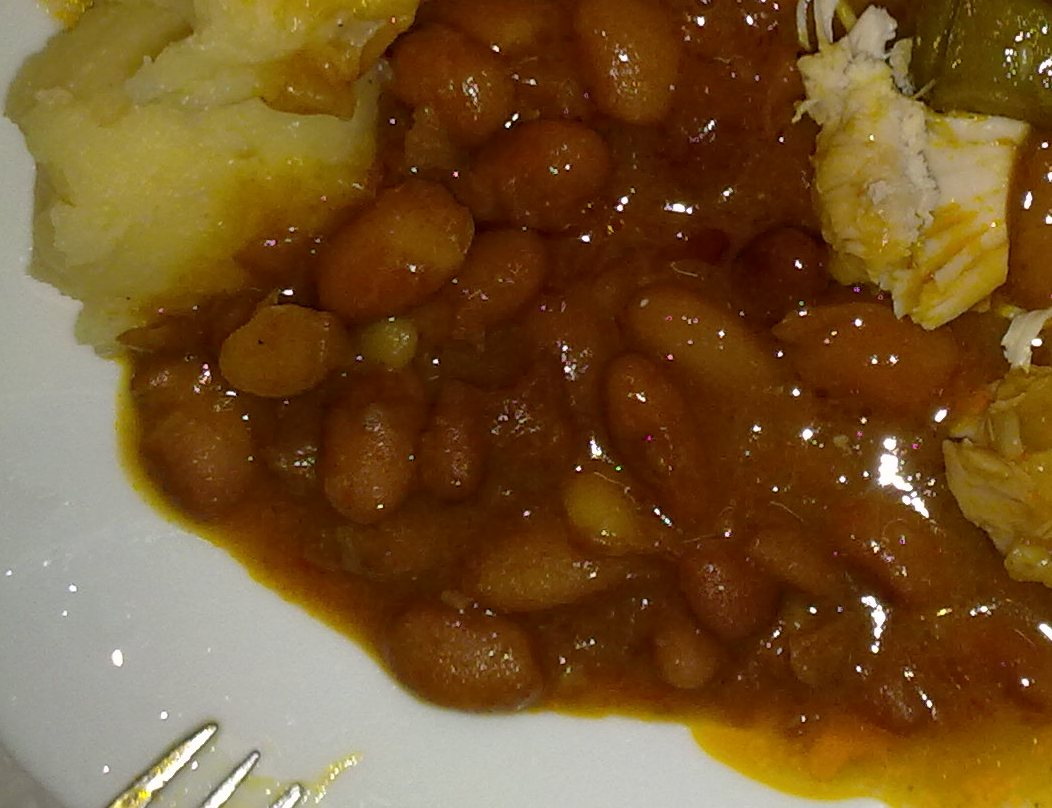
Feijão de óleo de palma—beans with palm oil, a traditional dish of Angola

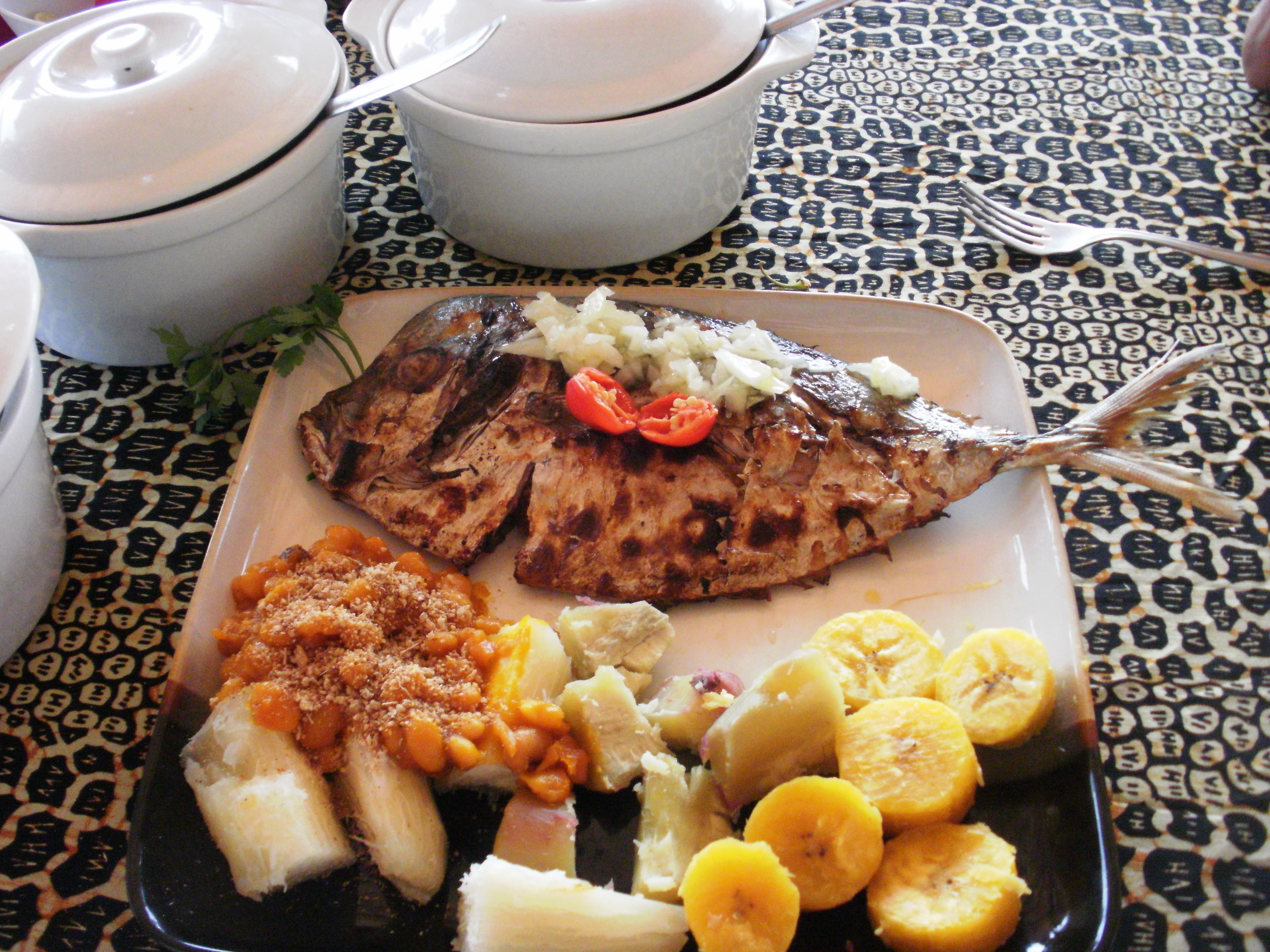
Mufete, a typical dish

Funge (or funje, Portuguese pronunciation: [ˈfũʒɨ]) and pirão ([piˈɾɐ̃w]) are very common dishes, and in poorer households often consumed at every meal. The dish is often eaten with fish, pork, chicken, or beans. funge de bombo ([ˈfũʒɨ ðɨ ˈβõbu]), more common in northern Angola, is a paste or porridge of cassava (also called manioc or yuca), made from cassava flour. It is gelatinous in consistency and gray in color. Pirão, yellow in color and similar to polenta, is made from cornflour and is more common in the south. Fuba ([fuˈβa]) is the term for the flour that is used to make either funge and pirão, also used to make angu, the Brazilian polenta. Both foods are described as bland but filling and are often eaten with sauces and juices or with gindungo (see below), a spicy condiment.

Moamba de galinha (or chicken moamba, [ˈmwɐ̃bɐ ðɨ ɣɐˈlĩɲɐ]) is chicken with palm paste, okra, garlic and palm oil hash or red palm oil sauce, often served with rice and funge. Both funge and moamba de galinha have been considered the national dish. A variant dish of moamba de galinha, moamba de ginguba, uses ginguba ([ʒĩˈɡuβɐ], peanut sauce) instead of palm paste.

=== List of dishes ===
Other dishes common in Angolan cuisine include:

- Arroz (rice) dishes, including arroz da Ilha (rice with chicken or fish), arroz de garoupa da Ilha ([ɐˈʁoʒ ðɨ ɣɐˈɾopɐ ðɐ ˈiʎɐ], (rice with grouper), and arroz de marisco ([mɐˈɾiʃku], white rice with seafood, typically prawns, squid, white fish, or lobster).
- Cabidela ([kɐβiˈðɛlɐ]), a dish cooked in blood, served with rice and funge. Frequently chicken (galinha de cabidela, galinha à cabidela), served with vinegar, tomatoes, onion and garlic. It was also incorporated to Brazilian cuisine.
- Caldeirada de cabrito ([kaldɐjˈɾaðɐ ðɨ kɐˈβɾitu]), goat meat stew served with rice, a traditional dish for Angolan independence day, November 11.
- Fish stews, including caldeirada de peixe ([dɨ ˈpɐjʃɨ]), made with "whatever is available" and served with rice, and muzongue ([muˈzõɡɨ]), made from whole dried and fresh fish cooked with palm oil, sweet potato, onion, tomato, spinach, and spices, and served with rice, spinach, funje, and farofa; some Angolans believe that the stew is a hangover cure if eaten before the onset of the headache.
- Calulu ([kɐluˈlu]), dried fish with vegetables, often onions, tomatoes, okra, sweet potatoes, garlic, palm oil, and gimboa leaves (similar to spinach); often served with rice, funge, palm oil beans, and farofa.
- Caruru ([kɐɾuˈɾu]), a shrimp and okra stew, of Brazilian origin.
- Catatos ([kɐˈtatuʃ]), caterpillar fried with garlic, served with rice; a specialty in Uíge
- Chikuanga ([ʃikuˈɐ̃ɡɐ]), a bread made from manioc flour, served in a wrap of banana leaves; a specialty of northeast Angola.
- Cocada amarela ([kuˈkaðɐ] or [kɔˈkaðɐ]), yellow coconut pudding made with sugar, grated coconut, egg yolks, and ground cinnamon, a dessert in both Mozambique and Angola. It is very different from what is known as cocada in Brazil.
- Doce de ginguba ([ˈdosɨ ðɨ ʒĩˈɡuβɐ]), peanut candy.
- Farofa ([fɐˈɾɔfɐ]), rice and beans with toasted manioc flour on top; a dish of Brazilian origin common in Angola.
- Feijão de óleo de palma ([fɐjˈʒɐ̃w ˈdjɔlju ðɨ ˈpalmɐ]) or dendem, beans, onion, and garlic cooked in palm oil; often served with fish, banana and farofa.
- Frango (grelhado) piri-piri ([ˈfɾɐ̃ɡu ˌpiɾiˈpiɾi]), native to Angola and Mozambique, also a former Portuguese colony; a grilled chicken in a very hot marinade of piri piri hot pepper and sometime also minced chili peppers, salt, and lemon or lime juice.
- Gafanhotos de palmeira ([ɡɐfɐˈɲotuʒ ðɨ palˈmɐjɾɐ]), toasted grasshopper from a palm tree, a Cuanza Norte specialty; often served with funge.
- Gindungo ([ʒĩˈdũɡu]), a spicy condiment made of chili pepper, garlic, onion, and sometimes brandy; thought by some Angolans to be an aphrodisiac
- Jinguinga ([ʒĩˈɡĩɡɐ]), goat tripe and blood, a specialty of Malanje, often served with rice and funge.
- Kifula, game meat served with boiled and toasted palm tree grasshoppers, a specialty of Cuanza Norte, served with funge.
- Kissuto rombo ([kiˈsutu ˈʁõbu]), roasted goat with garlic and lemon juice, served with rice and chips.
- Kitaba or quitaba ([kiˈtaβɐ]), a crunchy peanut paste seasoned with chilli pepper.
- Kitetas ([kiˈtetɐʃ]), clams, often cooked in a white wine sauce and served with bread.
- Kizaka ([kiˈzakɐ]), the leaves of the manioc plant, similar to spinach and often prepared with ginguba (peanut) and finely chopping and seasoned Kizaka com peixe is kizaka with fish, onion, and tomato, served with rice and funge.
- Leite azedo com pirão de milho ([ˈlɐjtj ɐˈzeðu kõ piˈɾɐ̃w dɨ ˈmiʎu]), a Huíla specialty, sour milk with maize porridge.
- Mafuma ([mɐˈfumɐ]), frog meat, a Cunene specialty.
- Mariscos cozidos com gindungo ([mɐˈɾiʃkuʃ kuˈziðuʃ kõ ʒĩˈdũɡu]), lobsters, prawns, and clams cooked in seawater, served with rice and hot sauce
- Mousse de maracujá ([ˈmusɨ ðɨ mɐɾɐkuˈʒa]), a mousse of passionfruit native to Brazil but popular in Angola.
- Mufete de kacusso (or cacusso, ([muˈfɛtɨ ðɨ kɐˈkusu])), grilled fish, often river tilapia, in a rich sauce of onion, vinegar, and spices, variously served with palm oil beans and cooked manioc, rice, sweet potato, or farofa.
- Mukua ([muˈku.ɐ]), dried fruit of the baobab tree, often made into ice cream.
- Molho cru ([ˈmoʎu ˈkɾu]), sauce or paste served with seafood and fish, made of garlic cloves, scallions (spring onions), parsley, cumin, salt, vinegar, and water.
- Ngonguenha ([ɡõˈɡẽɲɐ]), toasted manioc flour, sugar, and milk, a savory dish.
- Papaya with port wine.
- Pavê de ginguba ([pɐˈve]), peanut sponge cake dessert.
- Pé-de-moleque ([ˈpɛ ðɨ muˈlɛkɨ]), peanut-and-caramel candy.
- Quiabos com camarão ([ˈkjaβuʃ kõ kɐmɐˈɾɐ̃w]), prawns with okra, garlic, onion, and tomato, served with rice.
- Tarco ([ˈtaɾku]), radishes with peanuts, palm oil, tomatoes, and onions, served alongside meat or fish.

== Beverages ==
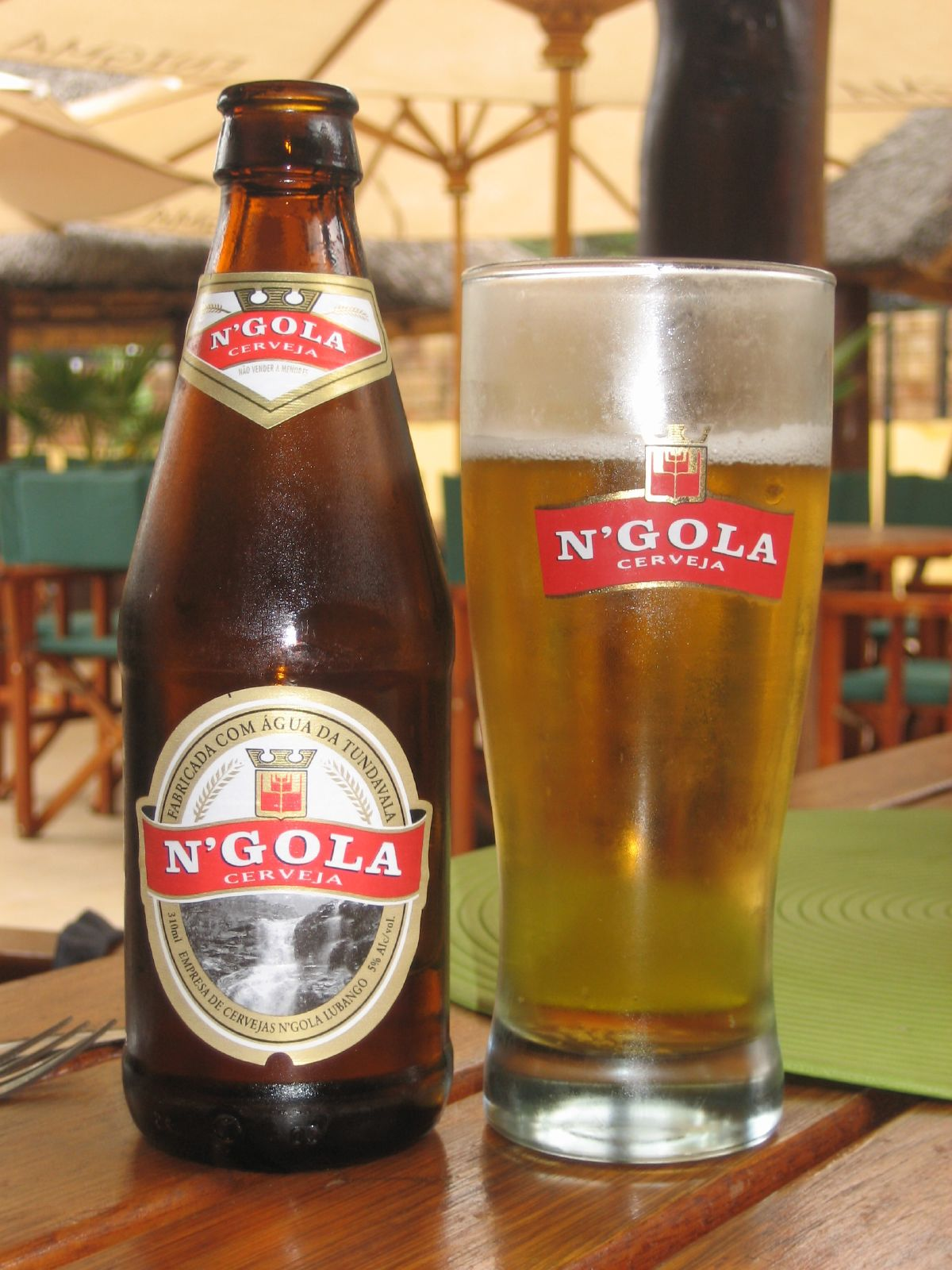
Cerveja N'Gola, an Angolan beer

A number of beverages, alcoholic and non-alcoholic, are typical to Angola.

Various homemade spirits are made, including capatica (made from bananas, a Cuanza Norte specialty), caporoto (made from maize, a Malanje specialty); cazi or caxipembe (made from potato and cassava skin); kimbombo (made from corn), maluva or ocisangua (made with palm tree juice, sometimes described as "palm wine," a Northern Angola specialty), ngonguenha (made from toasted manioc flour), and ualende (made from sugarcane, sweet potato, corn, or fruits, a Bie specialty). Other beverages are Kapuka (homemade vodka), ovingundu (mead made from honey), and Whiskey Kota (homemade whisky).

Popular non-alcoholic drinks including Kissangua, a Southern Angola specialty, a traditional non-alcoholic drink made of cornflour, have been used in indigenous healing rituals. Soft drinks such as Coca-Cola, Pepsi, Mirinda, Sprite, and Fanta are also popular. While some soft-drinks are imported from South Africa, Namibia, Brazil, and Portugal, the Angolan soft-drink industry has grown, with Coca-Cola plants in Bom Jesus, Bengo, and Lubango opening since 2000.

Mongozo is a traditional homemade beer made from palm nuts, a specialty of the Lundas (Lunda Norte and Lunda Sul). Mongozo was brewed by the Chokwe people before the arrival of Europeans, and mongozo is now commercially produced for export, including to Belgium, where it is produced by Van Steenberge.

Various commercial beers are brewed in Angola, the oldest of which is Cuca, brewed in Luanda. Others include Eka (brewed in Dondo in Cuanza Norte), N'gola (brewed in Lubango), and Nocal (brewed in Luanda).

== See also ==
- African cuisine
- West African cuisine
