= Kibatalia villosa =

Conservation status
- Vulnerable (IUCN 2.3)

Scientific classification
- Kingdom: Plantae
- Clade: Tracheophytes
- Clade: Angiosperms
- Clade: Eudicots
- Clade: Asterids
- Order: Gentianales
- Family: Apocynaceae
- Genus: Kibatalia
- Species: K. villosa

Binomial name
- Kibatalia villosa Rudjiman

Species of plant

Kibatalia villosa is a species of plant in the family Apocynaceae. It is found in Indonesia and Malaysia.
