= Micrechites =

Scientific classification
- Kingdom: Plantae
- Clade: Tracheophytes
- Clade: Angiosperms
- Clade: Eudicots
- Clade: Asterids
- Order: Gentianales
- Family: Apocynaceae
- Subfamily: Apocynoideae
- Tribe: Apocyneae
- Genus: Micrechites; Miq. (1857)

Synonyms
- Lamechites Markgr. (1925); Otopetalum Miq. 1857, nom. illeg. (not F. Lehm. & Kraenzl. 1899); Vallariopsis Woodson (1936)

Genus of plants

Micrechites is a genus of flowering plants in the family Apocynaceae, first described as a genus in 1857. It is native to China, the eastern Himalayas, Southeast Asia, Papuasia, and Queensland.

== Species ==
13 species arer currently accepted. Synonyms in parentheses are the names used in Flora of China.

1. Micrechites andamanicus M.Gangop. & Chakrab. – Andaman Islands
2. Micrechites archboldianus Merr. & L.M.Perry – western New Guinea
3. Micrechites glaber D.J.Middleton – Sabah
4. Micrechites grandiflorus (D.J.Middleton) D.J.Middleton – Papua New Guinea
5. Micrechites jacquetii Pierre ex Spire (syn. Ichnocarpus jacquetii (Pierre) D. J. Middleton) – Guangdong, Guangxi, Laos, and Vietnam
6. Micrechites lancifolius (Hook.f.) D.J.Middleton & Livsh. – Borneo, Peninsular Malaysia, and Sumatra
7. Micrechites malipoensis Tsiang & P.T.Li (syn. Ichnocarpus malipoensis (Tsiang & P. T. Li) D. J. Middleton) – Yunnan
8. Micrechites novoguineensis K.Schum. – Papua New Guinea
9. Micrechites parkinsonii M.Gangop. & Chakrab. – Andaman Islands
10. Micrechites polyanthus (Blume) Miq. (syn. Ichnocarpus polyanthus (Blume) P. I. Forster) – China (Guangdong, Guangxi, Hainan, and Yunnan), Nepal, Assam, Bhutan, Andaman Islands, Indochina, Malaysia, Borneo, Java, and Sumatra
11. Micrechites rhombifolius Markgr. – Maluku, Sulawesi, Papuasia, and Queensland
12. Micrechites serpyllifolius (Blume) Kosterm. – Thailand, Malaysia, Borneo, Sumatra, Java, Sulawesi, and Philippines
13. Micrechites warianus (Schltr.) D.J.Middleton – Papua New Guinea

Formerly included

1. Micrechites borneensis (King & Gamble) P.T.Li = Anodendron borneense (King & Gamble) D.J.Middleton
2. Micrechites formicinus Tsiang & P.T.Li = Anodendron nervosum Kerr.
3. Micrechites gracilis (King & Gamble) P.T.Li = Anodendron gracile (King & Gamble) D.J.Middleton
4. Micrechites minutiflorus (Pierre) P.T.Li = Urceola minutiflora (Pierre) D.J.Middleton
5. Micrechites napeensis Quint = Urceola napeensis (Quint.) D.J.Middleton
6. Micrechites ovalifolius Ridl. = Parameria polyneura Hook.f.
7. Micrechites sinensis Markgr. = Ichnocarpus frutescens (L.) W.T.Aiton
8. Micrechites tubulosus Ridl. ex Burkill & M.R.Hend. = Anodendron tubulosum (Ridl. ex Burkill & M.R.Hend.) D.J.Middleton
