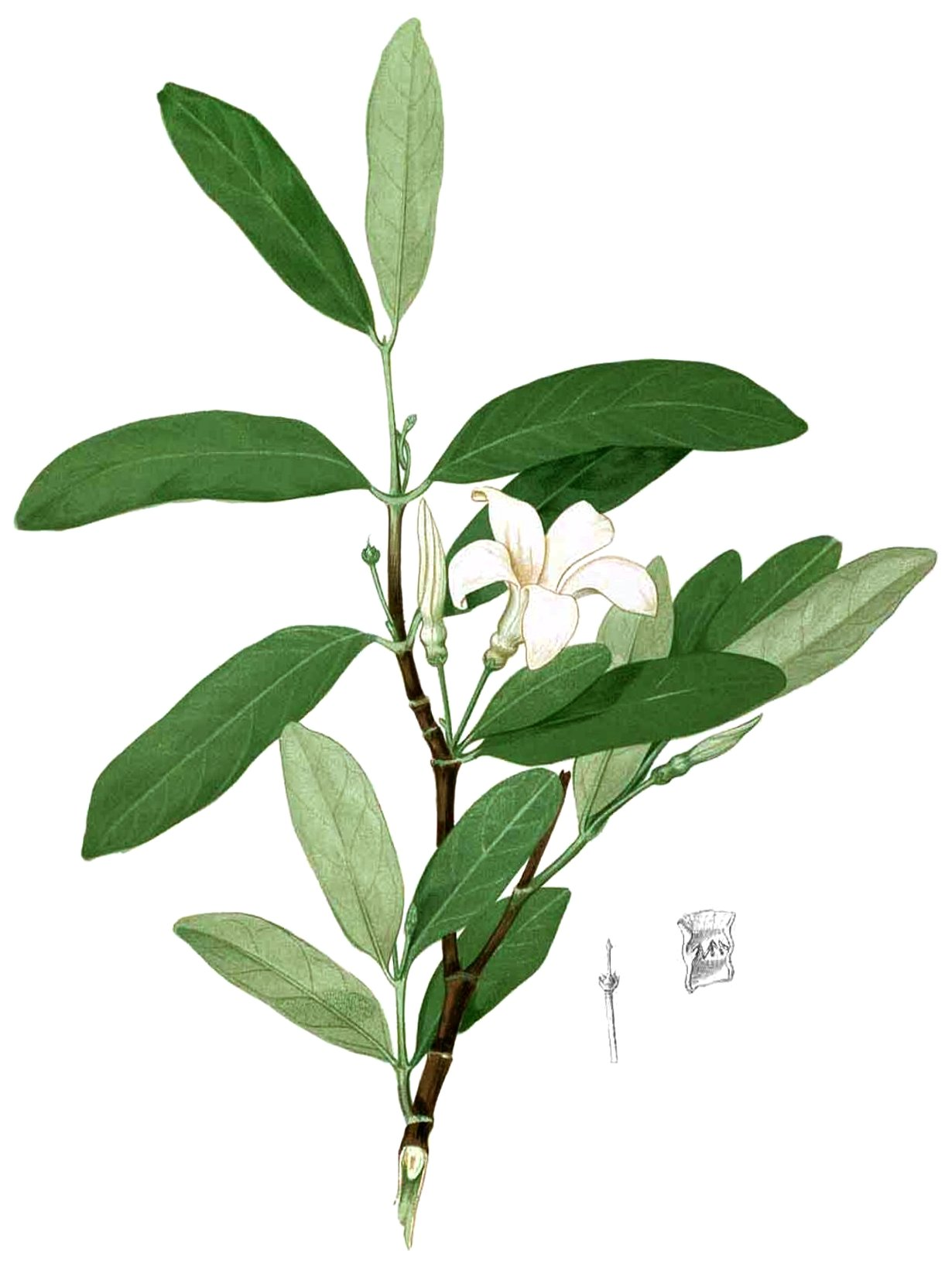
- Kibatalia arborea

Scientific classification
- Kingdom: Plantae
- Clade: Tracheophytes
- Clade: Angiosperms
- Clade: Eudicots
- Clade: Asterids
- Order: Gentianales
- Family: Apocynaceae
- Genus: Kibatalia
- Species: K. arborea

Binomial name
- Kibatalia arborea (Blume) G.Don

Synonyms
- Hasseltia arborea Blume; Kixia arborea (Blume) Steud.; Tabernaemontana ovalis Miq.

= Kibatalia arborea =

Species of plant

Kibatalia arborea is a tree in the dogbane family Apocynaceae.

== Description ==
Kibatalia arborea grows as a tree up to 45 metres (150 ft) tall, with a trunk diameter of up to 100 centimetres (40 in). The bark is grey, grey-brown, dark brown or black. Inflorescences bear up to two flowers. The flowers feature a white or creamy corolla. Local traditional medicinal uses include as a treatment for internal parasites.

== Distribution and habitat ==
Kibatalia arborea is native to Thailand and a wide area of Malesia. Its habitat is in lowland forests from sea-level to 500 metres (1,600 ft) altitude.
