= Kibatalia wigmanii =

Conservation status
- Vulnerable (IUCN 3.1)

Scientific classification
- Kingdom: Plantae
- Clade: Tracheophytes
- Clade: Angiosperms
- Clade: Eudicots
- Clade: Asterids
- Order: Gentianales
- Family: Apocynaceae
- Genus: Kibatalia
- Species: K. wigmanii

Binomial name
- Kibatalia wigmanii (Koord.) Merr.

Synonyms
- Kixia wigmanii Koord.

Species of plant

Kibatalia wigmanii is a species of plant in the family Apocynaceae. It is a tree endemic to Sulawesi in Indonesia. It is a vulnerable species threatened by habitat loss.
