= Kibatalia borneensis =

Conservation status
- Endangered (IUCN 2.3)

Scientific classification
- Kingdom: Plantae
- Clade: Tracheophytes
- Clade: Angiosperms
- Clade: Eudicots
- Clade: Asterids
- Order: Gentianales
- Family: Apocynaceae
- Genus: Kibatalia
- Species: K. borneensis

Binomial name
- Kibatalia borneensis (Stapf) Merr.

Synonyms
- Kixia borneensis Stapf

Species of plant

Kibatalia borneensis is a species of plant in the family Apocynaceae. It is endemic to the state of Sarawak, part of Malaysia on the island of Borneo. It is threatened by habitat loss.
