= Moambe =

Ingredient made from palm nuts

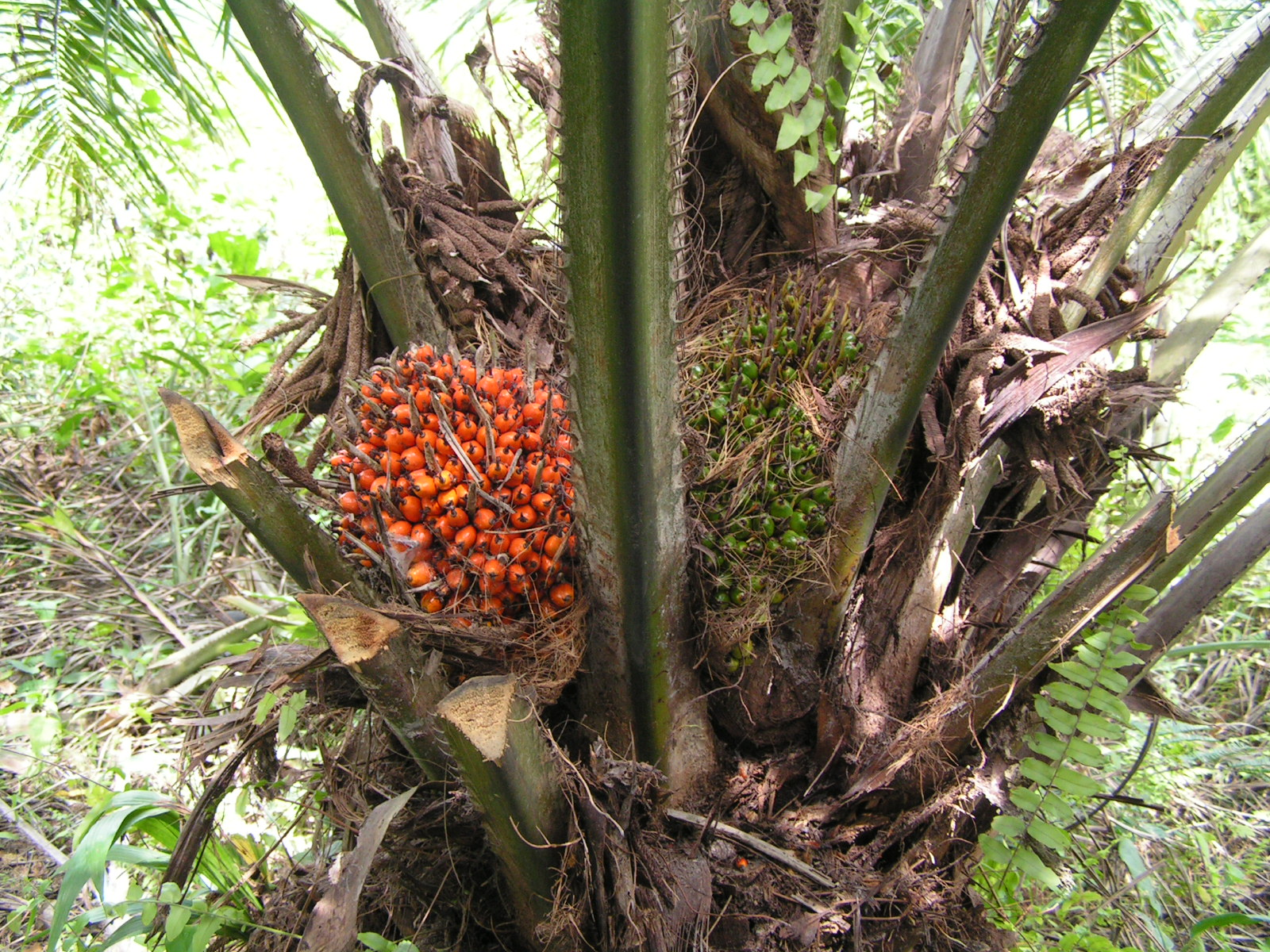
Oil palm fruit

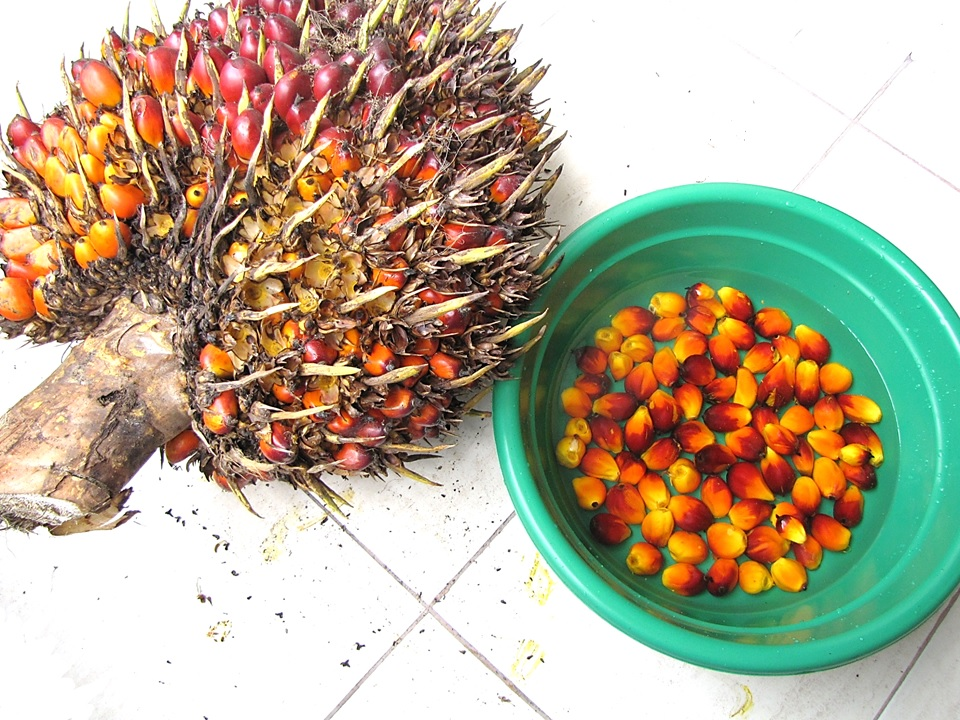
Harvesting palm nuts for moambe

Palm butter or palm cream, frequently known as moambe, mwambe or nyembwe, is an ingredient made from the pericarp (not the seeds) of palm nuts, the fruit of the African oil palm (Elaeis guineensis) tree. It forms an important ingredient in stews and sauces in African cuisine.

Dishes made with the sauce often include peanuts, peanut sauce, or peanut butter. The meat usually used in the dishes is chicken but other meats, such as beef, fish, mutton, or any wild game meat, such as crocodile or venison, are used as well. Moambe chicken is considered a national dish of three African countries.

== Regional variations ==
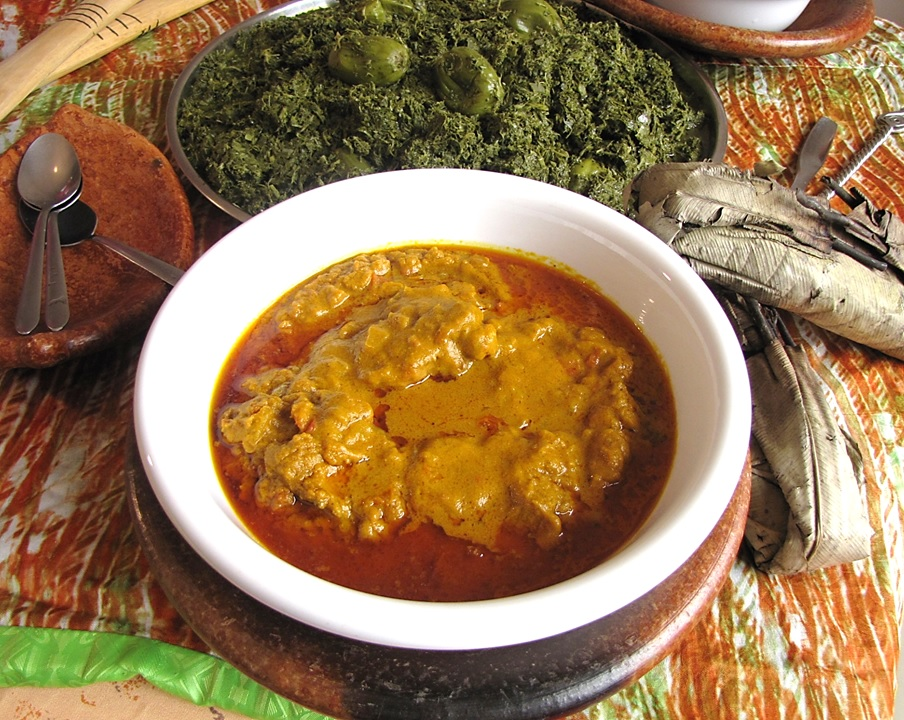
Dish of poulet moambe

In order to make palm butter, palm nuts are boiled and then pounded. The pulp is mixed with water, sieved and boiled again. Canned palm soup base, also called sauce graine or noix de palme may be substituted.

=== Angola ===
In Angola, the dish is called moamba de galinha and is considered a national dish as well. It is usually served with funge, a manioc purée, and can be made with fish on occasions.

=== Democratic Republic of the Congo ===
In western regions of the Democratic Republic of the Congo, mwambi or mwambe (Lingala: mwǎmba) is the name given to the sauce of palm oil or peanuts. Poulet à la Moambé, "chicken in a moambe sauce", is also considered the Congo's national dish.

=== Gabon ===
In Gabon, the sauce is usually called nyembwe, from the Myene word for palm oil. The most important dish using nyembwe is nyembwe chicken (French: poulet [au] nyembwe or poulet [au] gnemboue) which is considered a national dish of Gabon.

== See also ==
- Palm oil
- List of sauces
- List of stews
