= Kibatalia puberula =

Conservation status
- Endangered (IUCN 3.1)

Scientific classification
- Kingdom: Plantae
- Clade: Tracheophytes
- Clade: Angiosperms
- Clade: Eudicots
- Clade: Asterids
- Order: Gentianales
- Family: Apocynaceae
- Genus: Kibatalia
- Species: K. puberula

Binomial name
- Kibatalia puberula Merr.

Species of plant

Kibatalia puberula is a species of flowering plant in the family Apocynaceae. It is a tree endemic to Samar in the Philippines.
