= Kibatalia macgregori =

Conservation status
- Critically Endangered (IUCN 3.1)

Scientific classification
- Kingdom: Plantae
- Clade: Tracheophytes
- Clade: Angiosperms
- Clade: Eudicots
- Clade: Asterids
- Order: Gentianales
- Family: Apocynaceae
- Genus: Kibatalia
- Species: K. macgregori

Binomial name
- Kibatalia macgregori (Elmer) Woodson

Synonyms
- Kixia macgregorii Elmer

Species of plant

Kibatalia macgregori is a species of plant in the family Apocynaceae. It is endemic to the Philippines.
