= Kibatalia longifolia =

Conservation status
- Critically Endangered (IUCN 3.1)

Scientific classification
- Kingdom: Plantae
- Clade: Tracheophytes
- Clade: Angiosperms
- Clade: Eudicots
- Clade: Asterids
- Order: Gentianales
- Family: Apocynaceae
- Genus: Kibatalia
- Species: K. longifolia

Binomial name
- Kibatalia longifolia Merr.

Species of plant

Kibatalia longifolia is a species of plant in the family Apocynaceae. It is endemic to the Philippines.
