= Kibatalia maingayi =

Scientific classification
- Kingdom: Plantae
- Clade: Tracheophytes
- Clade: Angiosperms
- Clade: Eudicots
- Clade: Asterids
- Order: Gentianales
- Family: Apocynaceae
- Genus: Kibatalia
- Species: K. maingayi

Binomial name
- Kibatalia maingayi (Hook.f.) Woodson

Synonyms
- Holarrhena daronensis Elmer; Kibatalia daronensis (Elmer) Woodson; Paravallaris maingayi (Hook.f.) Kerr; Vallaris daronensis (Elmer) Merr.; Vallaris maingayi Hook.f.

Species of plant

Kibatalia maingayi is a tree in the family Apocynaceae.

== Description ==
Kibatalia maingayi grows as a tree up to 40 metres (130 ft) tall, with a trunk diameter of up to 120 centimetres (50 in). The bark is pale brown, dark grey or whitish. Inflorescences bear up to 25 flowers. The flowers feature a white or pale yellow corolla. The fruits are cylindrical, up to 0.6 cm (0.2 in) long.

== Distribution and habitat ==
Kibatalia maingayi is native to Thailand, Peninsular Malaysia, Singapore, Sumatra, Borneo and the Philippines. Its habitat is lowland and lower montane forests.
