= Kissuto rombo =

Goat meat dish from Angola

Kissuto rombo (Portuguese pronunciation: [kiˈsutu ˈʁõbu]) is a traditional meat dish originating from Angola. The dish is prepared with roasted goat meat rubbed with a combination of garlic and lemon juice.

== Ingredients ==
- Lemon juice
- Garlic
- Goat
- White wine
- Bay leaves
- olive oil
- Salt

== Preparation ==
The goat is cleaned and rubbed with a combination of garlic and lemon juice. The meat is marinated overnight in a mixture of other ingredients, which may include hot peppers, bay leaves, olive oil, salt, and white pepper. It is then roasted in the oven, where it is basted occasionally with white wine. Once it is fully cooked, it is then served with rice and chips on the side.
