= Kibatalia gitingensis =

Conservation status
- Near Threatened (IUCN 3.1)

Scientific classification
- Kingdom: Plantae
- Clade: Tracheophytes
- Clade: Angiosperms
- Clade: Eudicots
- Clade: Asterids
- Order: Gentianales
- Family: Apocynaceae
- Genus: Kibatalia
- Species: K. gitingensis

Binomial name
- Kibatalia gitingensis (Elmer) Woodson

Synonyms
- Kixia gitingensis Elmer; Vallaris gitingensis (Elmer) Merr. Vallaris angustifolia Merr.

Species of plant

Kibatalia gitingensis is a species of plant in the family Apocynaceae. It is endemic to the Philippines.
