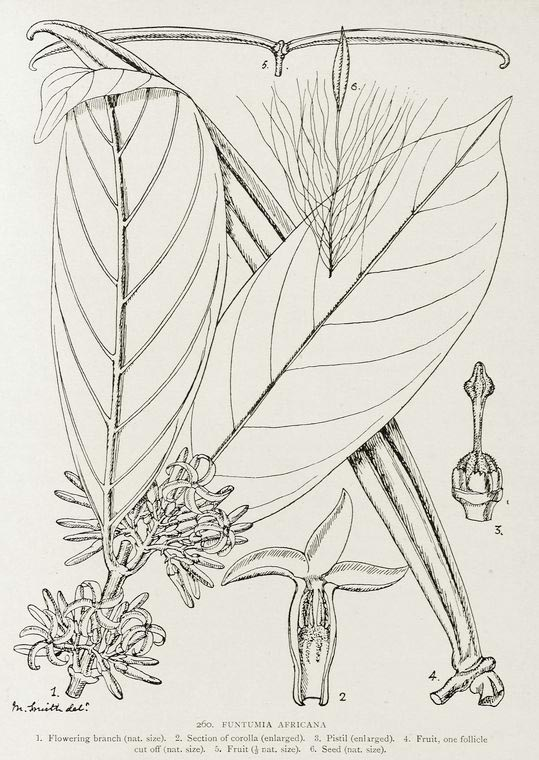
- Funtumia africana

Scientific classification
- Kingdom: Plantae
- Clade: Tracheophytes
- Clade: Angiosperms
- Clade: Eudicots
- Clade: Asterids
- Order: Gentianales
- Family: Apocynaceae
- Subfamily: Apocynoideae
- Tribe: Malouetieae
- Genus: Funtumia; Desf.

= Funtumia =

Genus of plants

Funtumia is a genus of flowering plants in the family Apocynaceae first described as a genus in 1900. It is native to Africa.

Species

- Funtumia africana (Benth.) Stapf - widespread from Senegal to Tanzania, south to Zimbabwe
- Funtumia elastica (Preuss) Stapf - widespread from Senegal to Sudan + Tanzania, south to Zaire
