= Micrechites lancifolius =

Scientific classification
- Kingdom: Plantae
- Clade: Tracheophytes
- Clade: Angiosperms
- Clade: Eudicots
- Clade: Asterids
- Order: Gentianales
- Family: Apocynaceae
- Genus: Micrechites
- Species: M. lancifolius

Binomial name
- Micrechites lancifolius (Hook.f.) D.J.Middleton & Livsh. (2018)

Synonyms
- Vallariopsis lancifolia (Hook.f.) Woodson (1936); Vallaris lancifolia Hook.f. (1882)

Genus of plants

Micrechites lancifolius is a species of flowering plants in the family Apocynaceae, It is a liana native to Peninsular Malaysia, Borneo, and Sumatra.

The species was first described as Vallaris lancifolia by Joseph Dalton Hooker in 1882. In 2018 it was placed in genus Micrechites by David John Middleton and Tatyana Livshultz.
