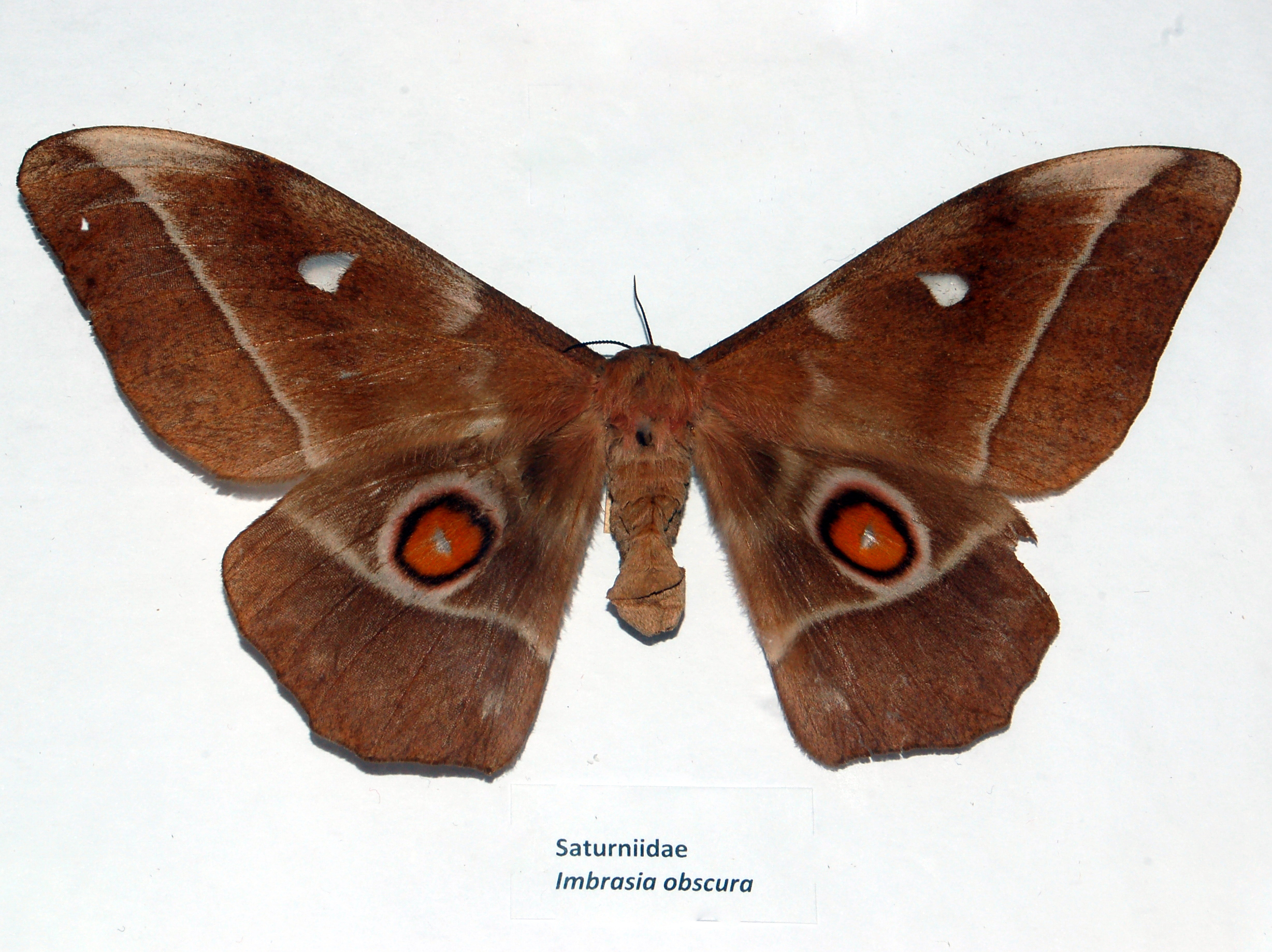
- Imbrasia obscura – dorsal view

Scientific classification
- Domain: Eukaryota
- Kingdom: Animalia
- Phylum: Arthropoda
- Class: Insecta
- Order: Lepidoptera
- Family: Saturniidae
- Tribe: Bunaeini
- Genus: Imbrasia; Hübner, 1819

Synonyms
- Lomelia Duncan [& Westwood], 1841

= Imbrasia =

Genus of moths

Imbrasia is a genus of moths belonging to the family Saturniidae first described by Jacob Hübner in 1819. Species of this genus are present in the tropical Africa.

== List of selected species ==
- Imbrasia epimethea (Drury, 1822) – Cameroon
- Imbrasia ertli Rebel, 1904 – Zambia
- Imbrasia longicaudata (Holland, 1894)
- Imbrasia obscura (Butler, 1878) – Cameroon
- Imbrasia truncata Aurivillius, 1908 – Cameroon
- Imbrasia vesperina Stoneham, 1962
