= Funtumia africana =

Scientific classification
- Kingdom: Plantae
- Clade: Tracheophytes
- Clade: Angiosperms
- Clade: Eudicots
- Clade: Asterids
- Order: Gentianales
- Family: Apocynaceae
- Genus: Funtumia
- Species: F. africana

Binomial name
- Funtumia africana (Benth.) Stapf

Species of plant

Funtumia africana is a tree within the family Apocynaceae, it is one of two species within the genus Funtumia.

== Description ==
Tree can grow up to 30 meters high but usually smaller, trunk is straight, cylindrical and may sometimes have buttress roots, smooth bark, greenish-brown to grey in colour with soft - light wood properties. Leaves, simple, opposite arrangement, glabrous, leathery surface, petiole 3 - 15 mm. Leaf-blade, elliptical to ovate in outline, size, 5 x 32 cm long and 1.7 x 17 cm wide, acuminate apex, cuneate at the base; lamina coriaceous, 8 - 14 pairs of lateral veins. Creamy - yellow, fragrant flower, Fruits, grey - brown and usually fusiform shaped,

== Distribution ==
Occurs in the forest zones of Lower and Upper Guinea and southwards up to Mozambique.

== Chemistry ==
Contain conanine, a group in a class of steroidal alkaloids.

== Traditional use ==
Latex used as an ingredient for arrow poison by the Guere people of Ivory Coast, latex extracts obtained from the species can be used to produce birdlime but useless as a rubber. Other extracts from the species are used to treat burns and incontinence. Wood is used to produce cheap furniture.
