= Funge =

Porridge from African cuisine

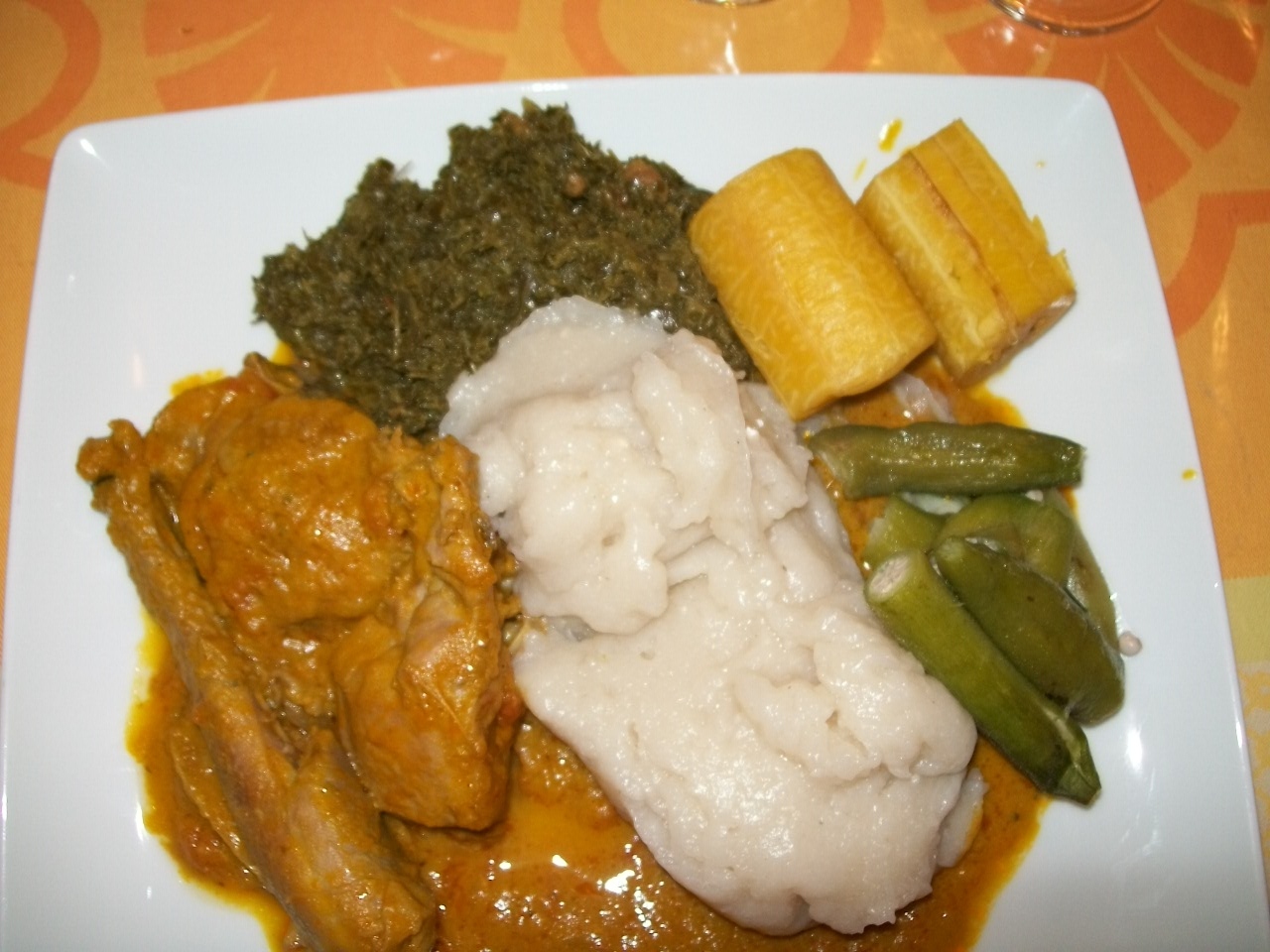
Funge with moamba de galinha

Funge or fúngi (Angola) or mfundi (Congo - DRC and the Congo Republic) is a traditional African swallow made of cassava flour whisked into boiling water. It can also be made with sorghum, maize, or millet. It can be served with textured vegetable, fish, or meat stew, as well as other vegetable, meat, and fish dishes. Funge is a staple food in African cuisine. Some richer and more flavorful versions may be made with stock, like fish stock, instead of water. It is also known as bidia (literally "food").

Funge is eaten with the fingers, and a small ball of it can be dipped into an accompanying stew, side dish or sauce.

Funge is a traditional staple in Angolan cuisine. In the Lesser Antilles, a similar food is known as fungi or cou-cou.

In Ghana there are two variations, usually made with ground corn, though the variation known as banku is sometimes made from a mixture of grated cassava and corn. The corn is allowed to ferment before it is cooked. To make banku the fermented mixture is cooked in a pot, but the variation called kenkey is only partially cooked before it is wrapped in banana leaves or corn husks and steamed.

In Brazilian cuisine, a similar dish made with cassava flour and fish stock is known as pirão.
