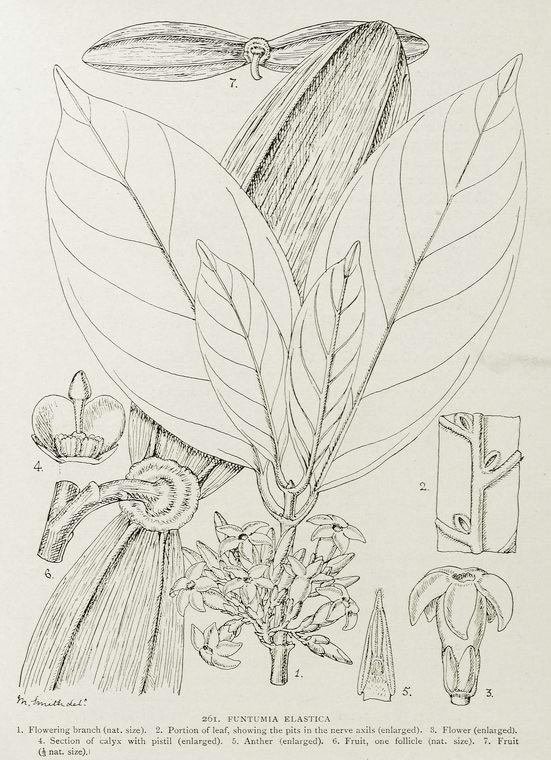

Scientific classification
- Kingdom: Plantae
- Clade: Tracheophytes
- Clade: Angiosperms
- Clade: Eudicots
- Clade: Asterids
- Order: Gentianales
- Family: Apocynaceae
- Genus: Funtumia
- Species: F. elastica

Binomial name
- Funtumia elastica (Preuss) Stapf

= Funtumia elastica =

Species of flowering plant

Funtumia elastica (also known as the bush rubber tree or silkrubber) is a medium-sized African rubber tree with glossy leaves, milky sap, and long woody seedpods. The bark is used in the traditional medicine of tropical Africa. It is economically important in West African countries such as Ghana, where it is commonly known as the ofruntum.

== Chemical constituents ==
A variety of chemical compounds have been identified in F. elastica. Unprocessed F. elastica powder is distinctly blue due to its anthocyanin content. The steroidal alkaloid conessine, which is found in F. elastica, has anti-bacterial properties in vitro.

== Bioactivities ==
Crude extracts of F. elastica inhibit growth of many molds, including Aspergillus, Penicillium, and Candida, as well as the fungi that cause ringworm.
