= Moambe chicken =

Savoury chicken dish; national dish of several African countries

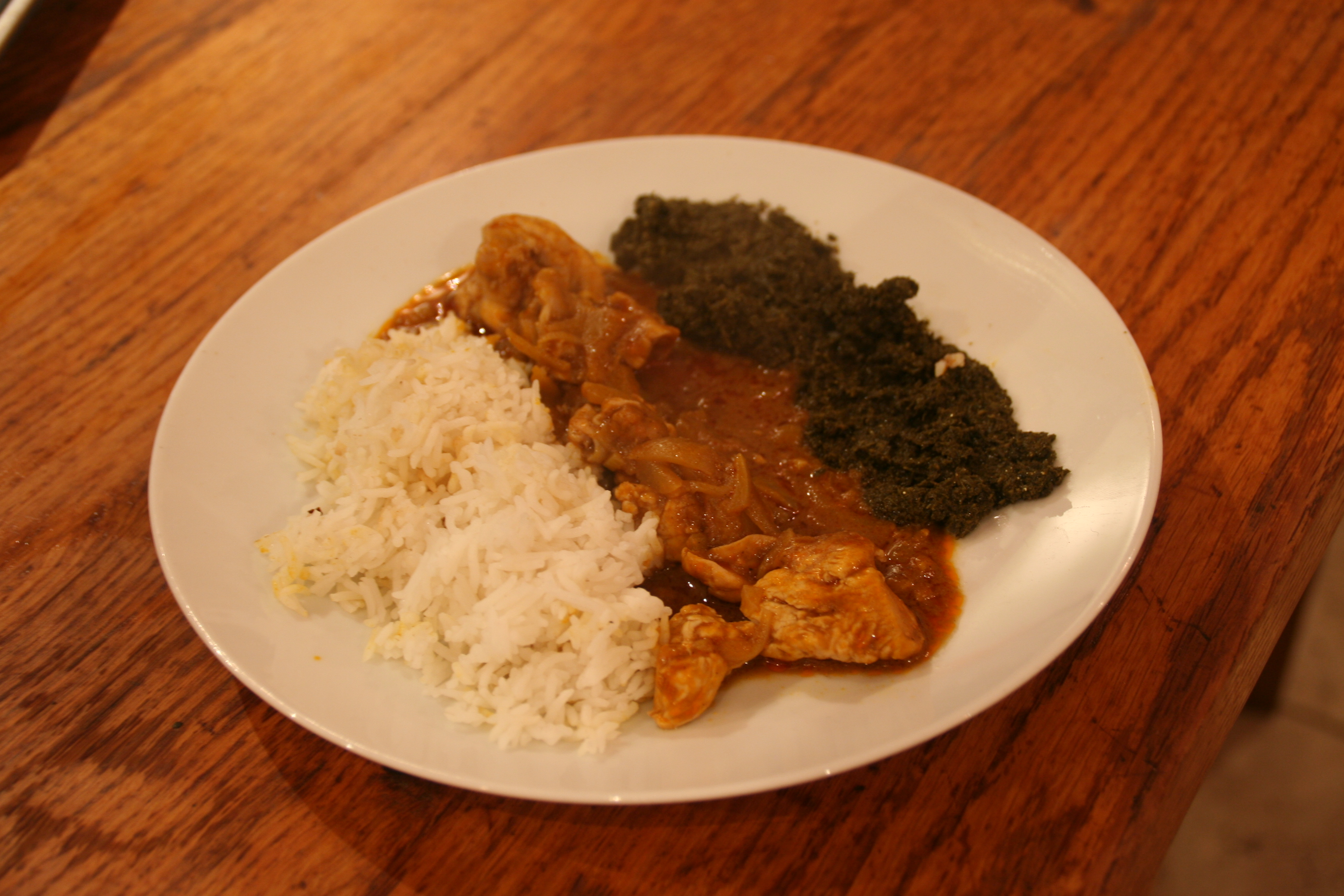
- Poulet à la moambe served with rice (left) and saka saka (right)
- Type: Stew
- Region or state: Central Africa
- Main ingredients: Chicken
- Ingredients generally used: Tomatoes, garlic, chili powder/peppers, lemon, red palm oil, squash or pumpkin, stock, okra

Moambe chicken (French: poulet à la moambe or simply poulet moambe, Portuguese: moamba de galinha) is a savory chicken dish popular in Central Africa and considered the national dish of Angola, the Republic of the Congo, and the Democratic Republic of the Congo. The dish itself is made by combining chicken, spices and palm butter to create a stew-like consistency. A number of local or regional variations exist across the Congo and Central Africa; the dish is also known outside the continent.

== Preparation ==
Poulet moambe (French for "chicken in palm butter sauce") is prepared by cooking chicken in moambe (palm butter) and spinach, then seasoning it with spices like peri-peri or red pepper. It is typically served with sweet potatoes, brown onions, hard-boiled eggs and a sauce made from crushed palm nuts. Moambe chicken can also be accompanied by rice or manioc (cassava) paste. The chicken can be substituted with duck or fish.

== Popularity ==
Moambe chicken is regarded as the national dish of the Democratic Republic of the Congo. In the Republic of the Congo, the version that uses peanut butter is known as muamba nsusu. Nsusu means chicken in Kikongo. It is also considered the national dish of Gabon where it is known as poulet nyembwe, and in Angola where it is known as moamba de galinha, although the Angolan dish was claimed by Brazilians around 2002, it has always been a popular dish in Angola, which makes sense as Angola and Congo are neighbours whilst although many Angolans live in Brazil, it was obviously introduced to Brazil by those with Angolan roots. This may also be why Moqueca is also very popular in Brazil but is actually an Angolan dish too. This is also why Brazil has its own version of pirão. It is a common household dish in Belgium. Angolan moamba chicken can be found in Portugal.
