= Dmanisi Paleolithic site =

Early Pleistocene archaeological and palaeontological site in Georgia

- Location in Georgia Dmanisi Paleolithic site (Caucasus Mountains)
- 41°20′14.09″N 44°20′41.66″E
- Type: Open-air archaeological and palaeontological site
- Periods: Early Pleistocene
- Cultures: Oldowan
- Location: Near Patara Dmanisi, Dmanisi Municipality, Kvemo Kartli, Georgia
- Part of: Dmanisi historic site

History
- Earliest documented occupation: c. 1.85 million years ago
- Latest documented occupation: c. 1.76 million years ago

Site notes
- Elevation: 910 metres (2,990 ft)
- Area: At least 40,000 square metres (9.9 acres)
- Discovered: 1983

Designations
- Designation: UNESCO World Heritage Tentative List (2007)

The Dmanisi Paleolithic site is an Early Pleistocene archaeological and paleontological locality beneath the ruins of the medieval town of Dmanisi in southern Georgia. Deposits on the Dmanisi promontory preserve evidence of repeated Lower Paleolithic occupations, including Mode 1 stone artifacts, animal and plant remains, and nearly 80 hominin fossils. The earliest securely documented occupations date to approximately 1.8 million years ago, while the hominin-bearing deposits formed around 1.77 million years ago.

The site is best known for the Dmanisi hominins, among the earliest securely dated skeletal remains of the genus Homo outside Africa. Its dated geological sequence allows the hominins and their stone technology to be studied alongside evidence for contemporary fauna, vegetation, climate and the processes that formed the fossil assemblages.

== Discovery and research ==
Archaeological investigation at Dmanisi initially concentrated on the medieval settlement, where excavations had been conducted since the 1930s. In 1983, paleontologist Abesalom Vekua identified a fossil rhinoceros tooth among animal remains exposed during this work. Stone artifacts were recognized the following year, establishing that Early Pleistocene archaeological deposits survived below the medieval buildings. The first hominin fossil, a mandible, was discovered in 1991. The first Dmanisi cranial remains were formally reported in 2000.

Subsequent excavations recovered five hominin skulls, several mandibles and bones from other parts of the skeleton, as well as large collections of artifacts and animal fossils. Further research expanded beyond the principal fossil-bearing blocks. Test excavations and exposed cross-sections across the promontory demonstrated that deposits containing artifacts and fauna extend over at least 40,000 square metres (9.9 acres), with preserved sequences as much as 6 metres (20 ft) thick.

Georgia submitted the property as the "Dmanisi Hominid Archaeological Site" to the UNESCO World Heritage Tentative List on 24 October 2007 under cultural criteria (iii) and (v).

== Location and geological setting ==
Dmanisi lies at an average elevation of about 910 metres (2,990 ft) on a promontory above the confluence of the Mashavera and Pinezauri rivers. The river valleys connect the volcanic uplands to the west and south with the Caspian lowlands to the east. During the Early Pleistocene, lava flowed down the Mashavera valley, covered the rocky ridge at the confluence and extended a short distance into the Pinezauri valley, damming the stream.

The cooled lava formed a basalt platform on which the archaeological deposits accumulated. Volcanic ash, wind-blown sediment, and material carried downslope subsequently covered the platform. As the two rivers cut more deeply into their valleys, the deposits were left on the elevated promontory later occupied by the medieval town. Most stone-working material was collected as rounded river cobbles or as angular blocks from nearby rock exposures.

== Stratigraphy and site formation ==
=== Sequence and chronology ===
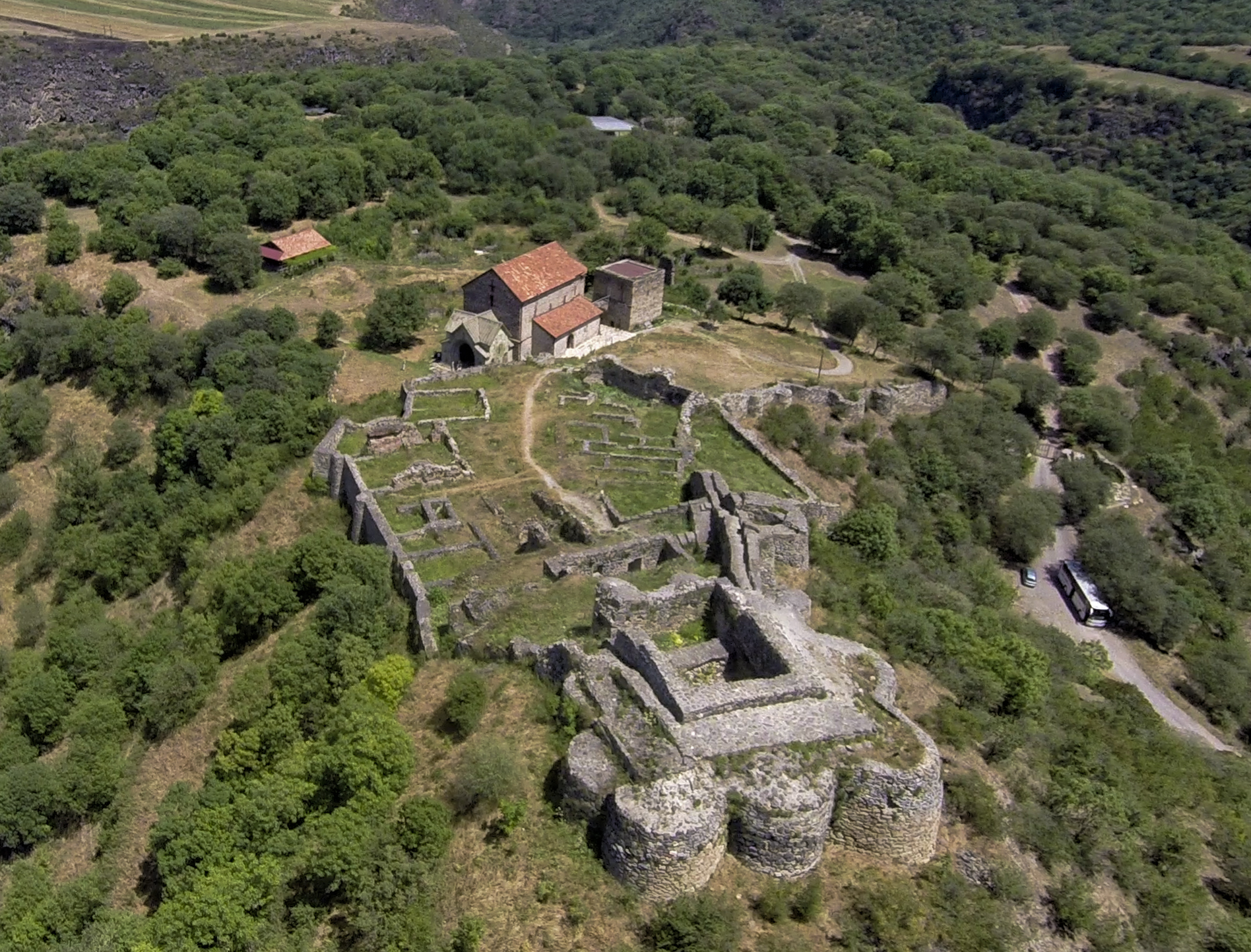
Dmanisi historic site. The Paleolithic deposits lie directly beneath and among the remains of the medieval town.

The sediments above the basalt are known as the Dmanisi Formation and are divided into Strata A and B. Their chronology is based on radiometric dating of volcanic rocks, the recorded reversals of Earth's magnetic field and the known time ranges of fossil animals. Regional volcanic dates provide an outer bracket of approximately 1.85–1.76 million years for the formation.

Stratum A, subdivided into A1–A4, consists mainly of successive volcanic-ash deposits separated by brief periods of soil formation. Magnetic minerals in these deposits point in the same direction as the present magnetic field, known as normal polarity, placing them within the closing part of the Olduvai subchron. Artifacts at several levels document repeated occupation. Direct dating of the uppermost basalt beneath Stratum A at M5 places these occupations between approximately 1.80 and 1.78 million years ago, refining the wider estimate of 1.85–1.78 million years proposed in earlier research.

A period of erosion separates Stratum A from Stratum B. Magnetic minerals in Stratum B point in the opposite direction, known as reversed polarity, showing that it accumulated after the end of the Olduvai subchron, during the early Upper Matuyama chron. Its lowest division, B1, comprises both sediment deposited on the slope and material filling underground erosion channels, collapse hollows and gullies. These fills yielded most of the vertebrate fossils and all hominin remains recovered from the principal excavation blocks. The main B1 fossil deposits formed around 1.77 million years ago. Strata B2–B5 consist mainly of deposits moving gradually down the slope, and B2 contains particularly dense concentrations of artifacts in several areas.

=== Formation and preservation ===
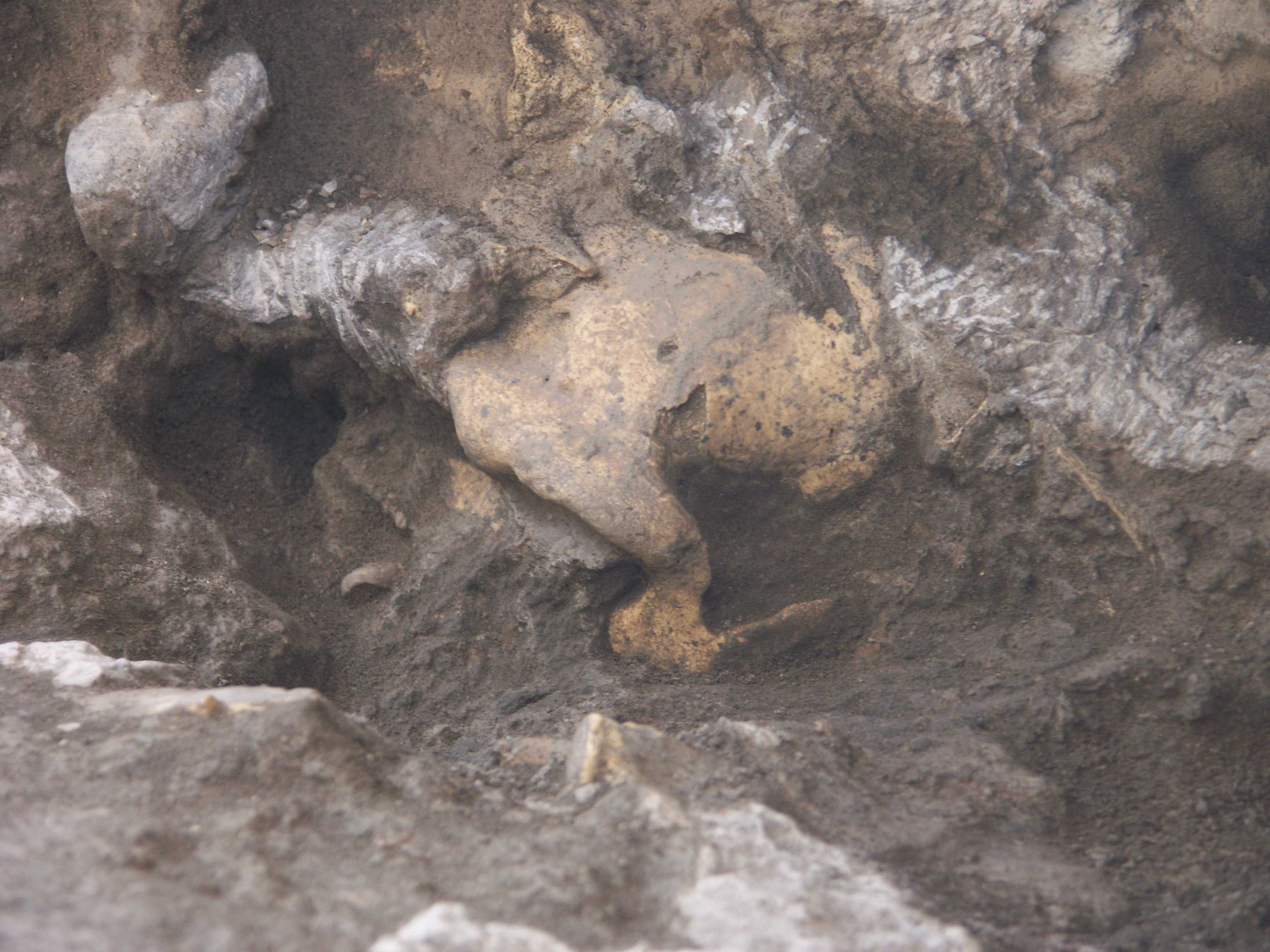
Dmanisi Skull 5 (D4500) at the time of discovery in 2005

Dmanisi records a succession of occupations rather than a single living surface. Ash-covered surfaces in Stratum A and relatively undisturbed slope deposits in Strata B1 and B2 have the greatest potential to preserve artifacts and bones close to their original positions, although erosion and animal burrowing disturbed some areas.

A different context is represented by the underground channels and gullies of B1. Water moving through the earlier deposits opened underground passages; their collapse and subsequent surface erosion created hollows and gullies. Some bones, artifacts and sediment entered these features from surrounding surfaces, while other remains may have been deposited directly within them. Ferring and colleagues estimated that the principal channels and gullies formed and filled within decades. The slight weathering of the B1 bones indicates that they generally remained exposed for only a short time before burial. Although these fills are unlikely to preserve intact living surfaces, rapid burial and their subsequent sealing beneath Stratum B2 produced large, well-preserved fossil assemblages.

The principal bone concentrations were not deposited by rivers. Bones of different sizes occur together rather than having been sorted by flowing water, and rounding, polishing and other evidence of prolonged transport are rare or absent.

== Hominins ==
Dmanisi hominin skull D4500 and mandible D2600 at the National Museum of Georgia

Nearly 80 hominin fossils have been reported from Dmanisi, representing at least five individuals. The collection includes five skulls, mandibles, isolated teeth, and bones from the rest of the skeleton. All derive from B1 channel-and-gully fills in the principal excavation area, rather than from the older artifact-bearing levels of Stratum A.

The postcranial remains include elements of the spine, shoulder, arms and legs. Their anatomy indicates upright walking but combines human-like lower limbs with features of the upper body that differ from later Homo. Preserved remains also indicate substantial differences in body size among the individuals.

The fossils combine small cranial capacities and other primitive traits with characteristics associated with early Homo erectus. Vekua and colleagues provisionally assigned them to H. erectus while noting affinities with H. habilis. Lordkipanidze and colleagues later argued that variation among the five skulls could occur within one population and supported their inclusion in a variable H. erectus lineage rather than division into several species.

A 2025 analysis of postcanine tooth-crown area reached a different conclusion. Among the three individuals studied, D4500-D2600 showed closer affinities to australopiths; D2282-D211 and D2700-D2735 aligned more closely with early Homo. Nery and colleagues interpreted this as support for two contemporaneous taxa, H. georgicus and H. caucasi. They acknowledged that tooth-size ratios alone could not exclude one species if its sexual dimorphism resembled that of living great apes, but considered the contrasting dental proportions better explained by two taxa.

== Stone technology ==
Stone artifacts from Dmanisi at the Georgian National Museum

The lithic industry represents Mode 1 technology and is comparable to the African Oldowan. It consists principally of flakes, cores and core-choppers. Retouched pieces are rare, and bifacial tools such as hand axes are absent. An analysis of material collected during excavations from 1991 to 2006 included more than 8,000 objects. Untouched or naturally fractured cobbles and blocks constituted 44.6% of the collection, while flakes and cores–choppers demonstrate that stone was worked at the site.

Basalt, fine-grained volcanic tuff and andesite were the principal raw materials. Rounded cobbles were collected from deposits associated with the Mashavera and Pinezauri rivers, while angular blocks of tuff came from nearby Late Cretaceous exposures. Estimated collection distances ranged from several hundred meters to several kilometers. Flakes were most commonly removed from one face in a single direction; opposed-direction and centripetal reduction patterns were comparatively rare. Knapping surfaces received little preparation, and stone quality influenced how extensively cores were worked.

The older Stratum A assemblages occur at several distinct levels and are dominated by flakes; cores and core-choppers are also present. Differences in raw-material selection and reduction intensity between Strata A and B demonstrate variation among the repeated occupations, while the technology remained within a Mode 1 framework.

== Paleoenvironment ==
Microscopic silica bodies formed in plants (phytoliths), together with pollen and larger plant remains such as fossil fruits, indicate that the local environment changed while the deposits accumulated. Lower deposits dating to the Olduvai subchron record a mixture of grassland and woodland under relatively warm and humid conditions. Pollen from the equivalent lower sequence at nearby Orozmani represents oak–hornbeam woodland, riverside forest, and higher forests containing chestnut and beech. Because pollen was generally poorly preserved at Dmanisi, the reconstruction draws principally on phytoliths and fossil fruits.

Near the end of the Olduvai subchron, the combined plant evidence indicates a marked reduction in rainfall and the expansion of open vegetation. During the documented hominin occupation, grasses and plants adapted to dry conditions dominated locally, while woodland remained on nearby higher ground. Messager and colleagues reconstructed a warm, relatively dry steppe-forest. Although its open structure has been compared with African savanna environments, the identified plants were predominantly temperate species.

Amphibians and reptiles independently indicate a warm, seasonally dry climate resembling that of the modern Mediterranean. Estimates based on the climatic ranges of related living species produced a mean annual temperature of 13.1 °C (55.6 °F) ± 2.4 °C and mean annual precipitation of approximately 635 millimetres (25.0 in) ± 191 mm. Summers were hotter and drier than at modern Dmanisi. The assemblage indicates environments ranging from steppe or semi-desert to open woodland, with rocky ground, shrubs, and permanent aquatic habitats.

Small mammals from Stratum B1 support this reconstruction of a varied but predominantly open landscape. When the species were grouped according to their preferred habitats, dry open meadow, waterside and rocky settings accounted for the largest proportions. Open habitats requiring more moisture were less prominent; woodland accounted for only a small proportion. The researchers reconstructed open steppe around Dmanisi, accompanied by rocky ground, wet areas, and limited woodland; the wider river valleys probably contained open water, wet ground, and gallery forest.

== Fauna ==
Fauna of the Dmanisi site
Taxon	Notes	Images
Salmo sp.	A salmonid fish	Modern Brown Trout (Salmo trutta)
Bufo ex gr. viridis	A toad	Modern European Green Toad (Bufo viridis)
Testudo graeca	Species extant	Modern Greek tortoise (Testudo graeca)
Lacerta ex. gr. viridis	A lizard	Modern European green lizard (Lacerta viridis)
Elaphe ex gr. quatuorlineata	A snake	Modern four-lined snake (Elaphe quatuorlineata)
Natrix sp.	A snake	Modern grass snake (Natrix natrix)
Struthio dmanisensis	A giant ostrich	Life restoration of Struthio dmanisensis
Gallus dmanisensis	An extinct species of fowl belonging to the junglefowl genus Gallus	
Strix gigas	An extinct owl species belonging to the earless/wood owl genus Strix	
Beremendia fissidens	An extinct species of shrew	
Sorex sp.	A shrew	Modern Sorex araneus
Ochotona cf. lagreli	An extinct genus of pika belonging to the genus Ochotona	
Hypolagus cf. brachygnathus	An extinct rabbit	
Apodemus aff. atavus	An extinct mouse belonging to the field/woodmouse genus Apodemus	
Cricetulus sp.	A hamster	Modern Chinese hamster (Cricetulus griseus)
Allocricetulus bursae	A hamster belonging to the genus Allocricetulus	
Tcharinomys tornensis	An extinct vole	
Mimomys pliocaenicus	An extinct vole belonging to the genus Mimomys, related to modern water voles (Arvicola)	
Parameriones aff. obeidiensis	An extinct gerbil	
Hystrix refossa	An extinct Old World porcupine	
Canis borjgali	An extinct canine	
Vulpes alopecoides	An extinct fox of the genus Vulpes.	
Canis (Xenocyon) lycaonoides	An extinct canine	Life restoration of Canis (Xenocyon) lycaonoides hunting
Ursus etruscus	An extinct bear	
Lutra simplicidens	An extinct otter	
Pannonictis nestii	An extinct mustelid	
Martes sp.	A marten	Modern European pine marten (Martes martes)
Meles sp.	A badger	Modern Caucasian badger (Meles canescens)
Pachycrocuta brevirostris	An extinct giant hyena	Life restoration
Lynx issiodorensis	An extinct lynx	
Acinonyx pardinensis	A larger relative of the modern cheetah	
Panthera onca georgica	A large pantherine big cat.	
Megantereon whitei	A leopard sized sabretooth cat	
Homotherium latidens	A lion-sized sabertooth cat	
Mammuthus meridionalis	A species of mammoth	
Equus stenonis	An extinct species of equine	
Equus altidens	An extinct species of equine	
Stephanorhinus spp.	Extinct species of rhinoceros	
Pseudodama nestii	Extinct species of deer	
Praemegaceros obscurus	Extinct species of giant deer	
Cervalces cf. gallicus	Early relative of modern moose	
Arvernoceros insolitus	Extinct species of deer	
Sus sp.	Pig	Modern wild boar (Sus scrofa)
Palaeotragus cf. priasovicus	Extinct species of giraffid	
Bison (Eobison) georgicus	Primitive species of bison	
Gallogoral meneghinii sickenbergii	Extinct species of caprine	
Capra dalii	Extinct species of the ibex/goat genus Capra	
Soergelia cf. minor	Extinct relative of muskox	
Praeovibos sp.	Extinct relative of muskox	
Pontoceros surprine	Extinct species of tragelaphine antelope	
Antilopini indet	Antelope	

Dmanisi faunal fossils on display at the Georgian National Museum

A 2022 synthesis listed 54 vertebrate taxa from Dmanisi, including 45 mammals. Large herbivores include horses, deer, bison and other bovids, a giraffid, rhinoceroses and the southern mammoth. The diverse carnivore assemblage includes canids, the giant hyena Pachycrocuta and five genera of the cat family, including sabre-toothed forms. Fossil ostrich is also present.

The large-mammal assemblage is dominated by Asian elements. It also contains animals with European and African affinities. A genus-level comparison found its closest similarities with somewhat younger assemblages in Greece, Italy and Spain. Bartolini-Lucenti and colleagues regarded the occurrence at Dmanisi of several taxa later recorded in Europe as consistent with progressive east-to-west dispersal.

The small-mammal assemblage contains representatives of shrews, hamsters, gerbils, mice, voles and pikas. Biogeographically, it is dominated by western or central Asian elements, while the European elements—represented principally by Mimomys and Apodemus—are less prominent. Amphibians and reptiles comprise at least six taxa: a green toad, Greek tortoise, green lizard, four-lined snake, an unidentified colubrid and a water snake.

The earlier Kvabebi assemblage in eastern Georgia, dated to approximately 3.07 million years ago, provides a regional comparison with Dmanisi. Although Kvabebi contained several mammals with African affinities, most are interpreted as surviving members of the older Greek–Iranian faunal province rather than evidence of a contemporary dispersal from Africa. Almost none persisted into the Dmanisi fauna, and the two assemblages show little overall similarity. Agustí and colleagues therefore concluded that Kvabebi did not represent the direct faunal background to the occupation of Dmanisi, which they associated instead with later climatic and faunal changes near the beginning of the Pleistocene.

== Bone accumulation and subsistence evidence ==
Nearly 85% of the studied medium- and large-mammal specimens come from Stratum B1. Carnivores constitute about 19–20 per cent of the B1 assemblage and are overrepresented relative to living mammal communities, particularly the canid Canis borjgali and several felids. Carnivore tooth marks are the most frequent bone modifications associated with feeding. Among broken long marrow bones, 74% were interpreted as having been broken while fresh or as preserving both fresh and later damage. Tooth-pit dimensions overlap those produced by modern lions and spotted hyenas. Together with concentrations of bones and coprolites in pipe and gully fills resembling modern burrows or dens, this led Tappen and colleagues to conclude that carnivores—especially Pachycrocuta and large cats—were probably the principal accumulators and modifiers of the bones.

Marks judged likely to have been made by stone tools occur on less than 0.5% of the examined assemblage. Their identification remains cautious because other forms of surface damage can resemble cut marks. Marks on the fleshy portions of upper limb bones were interpreted as evidence that hominins sometimes gained early access to carcasses, while marks on a mammoth rib probably represent scavenging. Other evidence indicates marrow extraction and possible skinning. The authors therefore characterized the Dmanisi assemblage as a palimpsest produced by hyena denning, large-cat activity, hominin meat consumption, and probable natural deaths, rather than by a single accumulating agent.
