= Dmanisi hominins =

Hominid species or subspecies discovered in Dmanisi, Georgia

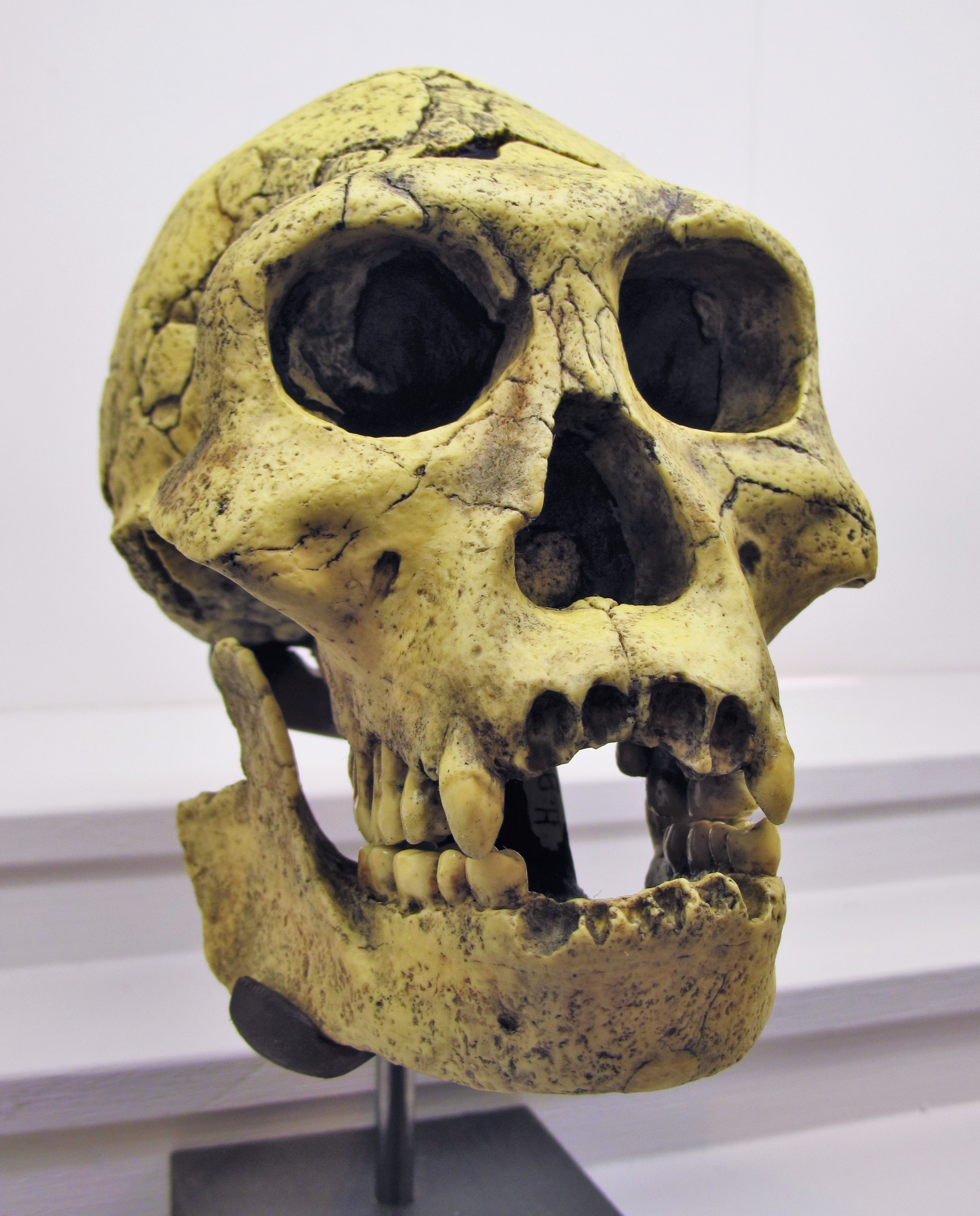
Replica of Dmanisi Skull 3, the skull of an adolescent individual, discovered in 2001

The Dmanisi hominins, Dmanisi people, or Dmanisi man were a population of Early Pleistocene hominins whose fossils have been recovered from the Dmanisi Paleolithic site, Georgia in the Southern Caucasus. The fossils and stone tools recovered at Dmanisi range in age from 1.85 to 1.77 million years old, making the Dmanisi hominins the earliest well-dated hominin fossils in Eurasia and the best preserved fossils of early Homo from a single site so early in time. Though their precise classification is controversial and disputed, the Dmanisi fossils are highly significant within research on early hominin migrations out of Africa. The Dmanisi hominins are known from over a hundred postcranial fossils and five famous well-preserved skulls, referred to as Dmanisi Skulls 1–5.

The taxonomic status of the Dmanisi hominins is somewhat unclear due to their small brain size, primitive skeletal architecture, and the range of variation exhibited between the skulls. Their initial description classified them as Homo (erectus?) ergaster (an otherwise African taxon), or potentially an early offshoot of later Asian H. erectus. The discovery of a massive jaw, D2600, in 2000 led researchers to hypothesize that more than one hominin taxon had been present at the site and in 2002, the jaw was designated as the type specimen of the new species Homo georgicus. Later analyses by the Dmanisi research team have concluded that all the skulls likely represent the same taxon with significant age-related and sexual dimorphism, though this is not a universally held view. In 2006, the team favoured subsuming the taxon under Homo erectus as H. erectus georgicus or H. e. ergaster georgicus. The nomenclature is still debated.

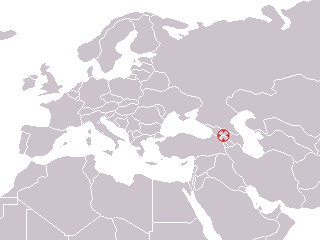
Location of discovery at Dmanisi, Georgia

Anatomically, the Dmanisi hominins exhibited a mosaic of traits, possessing some features reminiscent of later and more derived H. erectus and modern humans, while retaining features of earlier Homo and Australopithecus. The length and morphology of their legs was essentially modern and they would have been adapted to long-range walking and running, but their arms were likely more similar to the arms of Australopithecus and modern non-human apes than to later hominins. The Dmanisi hominins would also have differed from later (non-insular) Homo in their small body (145–166 cm; 4.8–5.4 ft) and brain size (545–775 cc), both of which are more comparable to H. habilis than to later H. erectus. Morphological traits unifying all of the skulls, though the degree in which they are pronounced differ, include large brow ridges and faces.

In the Pleistocene, the climate of Georgia was more humid and forested than it is today, comparable to a mediterranean climate. The Dmanisi fossil site was located near an ancient lake shore, surrounded by forests and grasslands and home to a diverse fauna of Pleistocene animals. The favourable climate at Dmanisi might have acted as a refuge for hominins in the Early Pleistocene and it would have been reachable from Africa through the Levantine corridor. Stone tools found at the site are of the Oldowan tradition.

== Taxonomy ==
=== Research history ===
==== Early excavations at Dmanisi ====
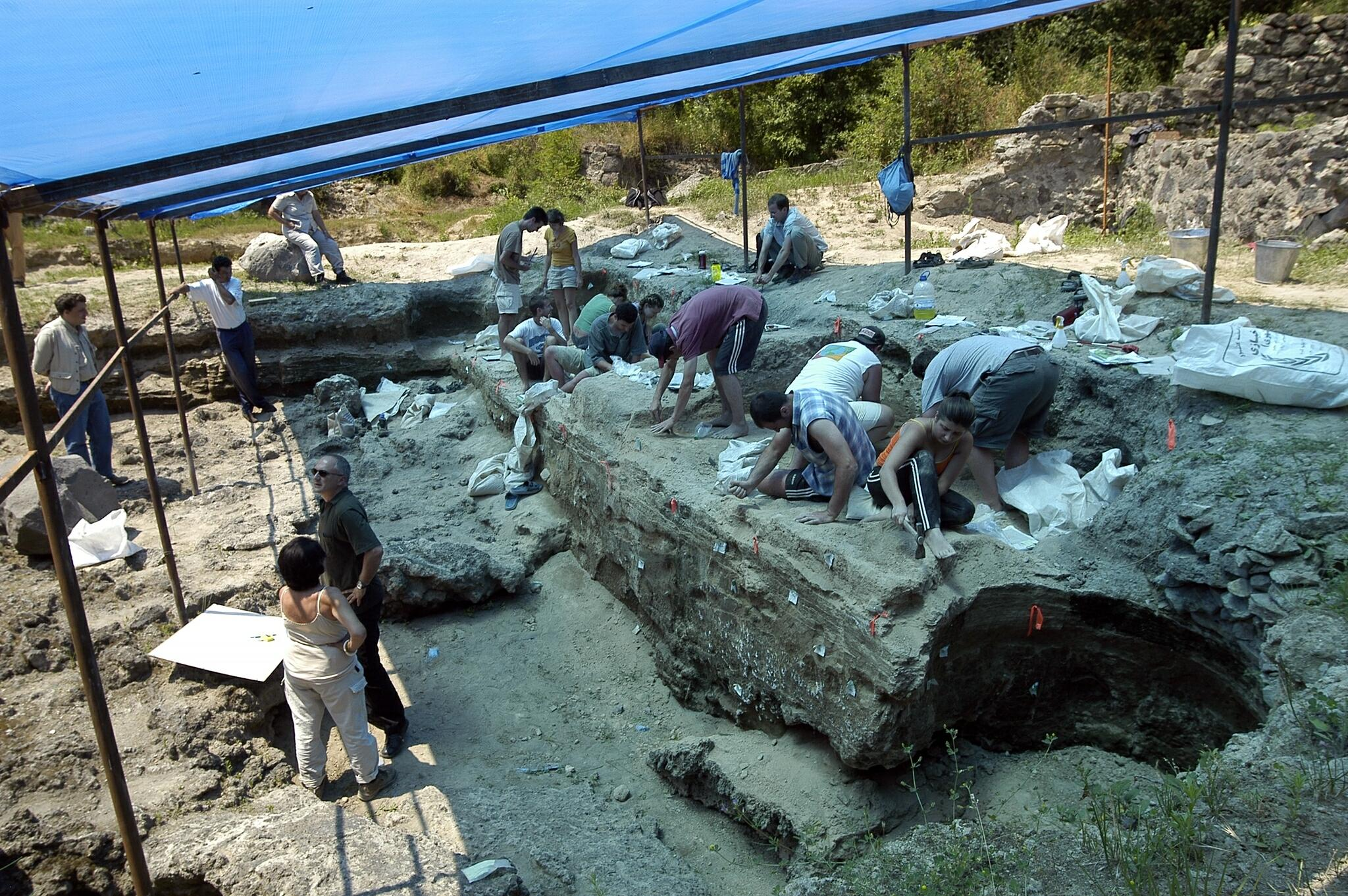
Excavation site at Dmanisi in 2007

Dmanisi is located in southern Georgia, about 85 kilometres (52.8 miles) from the country's capital, Tbilisi. It was founded as a city in the Middle Ages and has thus been a site of archaeological interest for some time, with a prominent archaeological excavation site being located within the ruins of the old city on a promontory overlooking the Mashavera and Pinazauri rivers. Archaeological excavations began in 1936 on the initiative of historian Ivane Javakhishvili, who directed several expeditions. In 1982, archaeologists at Dmanisi discovered 3 metre (10 ft) deep pits, cut in compact sandy clay. The archaeologists believed the pits were made for some economic purpose in the Middle Ages. After they cleaned them out, they discovered fossilised animal bones on the walls and bottom of the pits. The Georgian Paleobiological Institute of the Academy of Sciences was informed immediately and systematic palaeontological excavations began in 1983, but ended in 1991 on account of financial issues.

Location of Dmanisi in southern Georgia

During the 1983–1991 excavations, a large amount of animal fossils were collected, alongside some stone tools. The stone tools were quickly noted as highly archaic, far more primitive than other tools found in Eastern Europe. Biostratigraphically (dating through comparisons with fauna at other well-dated sites), they were determined to be from the Late Pliocene to the Early Pleistocene. Every year since 1991, the Georgian palaeontologists, joined by specialists from the Romano-Germanic Museum in Cologne, have undertaken new excavations, completely funded by the Romano-Germanic Museum until 1999.

==== Discovery of hominin remains ====
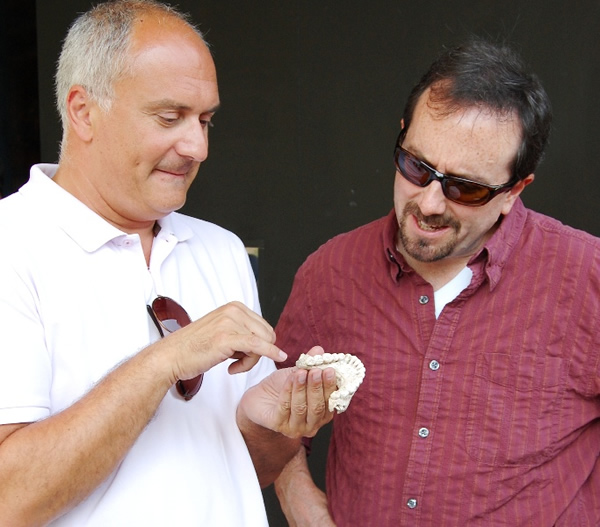
Georgian archaeologist and anthropologist David Lordkipanidze (left) showing a hominin jaw discovered at Dmanisi to American ambassador John R. Bass in 2010

The expedition in 1991 was highly productive, uncovering abundant animal fossils and a considerable quantity of stone tools. On the morning of 25 September, a group of young archaeologists led by Medea Nioradze and Antje Justus uncovered a mandible.

As the heads of the expedition, Georgian archaeologists and anthropologist Abesalom Vekua and David Lordkipanidze (then in Tbilisi) were summoned to the site and on the next morning, the mandible was freed from the rock around it, a complicated process that took nearly an entire day. Once freed, the mandible was unmistakably the jaw of a primate and importantly, it preserved a complete row of teeth with little sign of wear. The lack of wear suggested that the primate would have been young, about 20–24 years old, though its classification was as of yet unknown. After they returned to Tbilisi, the mandible was studied in detail by Vekua, Lordkipanidze and archaeologist Leo Gabunia. It was quickly determined to represent a hominid, though its precise position within the family was unclear. Although a number of primitive features were observed, it was clear that the fossil (now given the designation D211) was the most similar to fossils of Homo, not earlier australopithecines. After prolonged discussion, Vekua and Gabunia came to the conclusion that the Dmanisi hominin was probably an early Homo erectus, and that it represented the earliest Homo outside Africa. This was confirmed once the basalts lying directly below the Pleistocene sediments were determined to be about 1.8 million years old.

Excavations continued at the site, though hominin remains proved to be rare. In 1997, the right third metatarsal bone of a hominin was discovered in the same layer as the jaw. Further discoveries were made in May 1999. Because of long-lasting periods of rainfall, the site was damaged. Archaeologist and expedition member Gocha Kiladze found a thin, coin-sized skull fragment. Kiladze, Vekua, Lordkipanidze, alongside archaeologist Kakha Kakhiani and the head of the 1999 expedition, archaeologist Giorgi Kopaliani, then visited the site and discovered further fragments. With these fragments, they were able to piece together the skull of an archaic human, with broken off teeth and a broken off upper jaw. That same year, a more well-preserved skull was discovered and together, the two skulls allowed for inferences as to the nature and classification of the fossil hominins. The first skull, dubbed Skull 2, was given the designation D2282 and the second skull, Skull 1, was given the designation D2280. After studying the fossils for almost a year, it was determined that they somewhat differed from H. erectus in their jaws and skulls and were closer to the earlier African species H. ergaster (now considered an early African representative of H. erectus by some). The discovery of the two skulls was highly publicised in international media and the Georgian fossils were for the first time widely acknowledged as the earliest known hominins outside of Africa.

==== Further discoveries ====
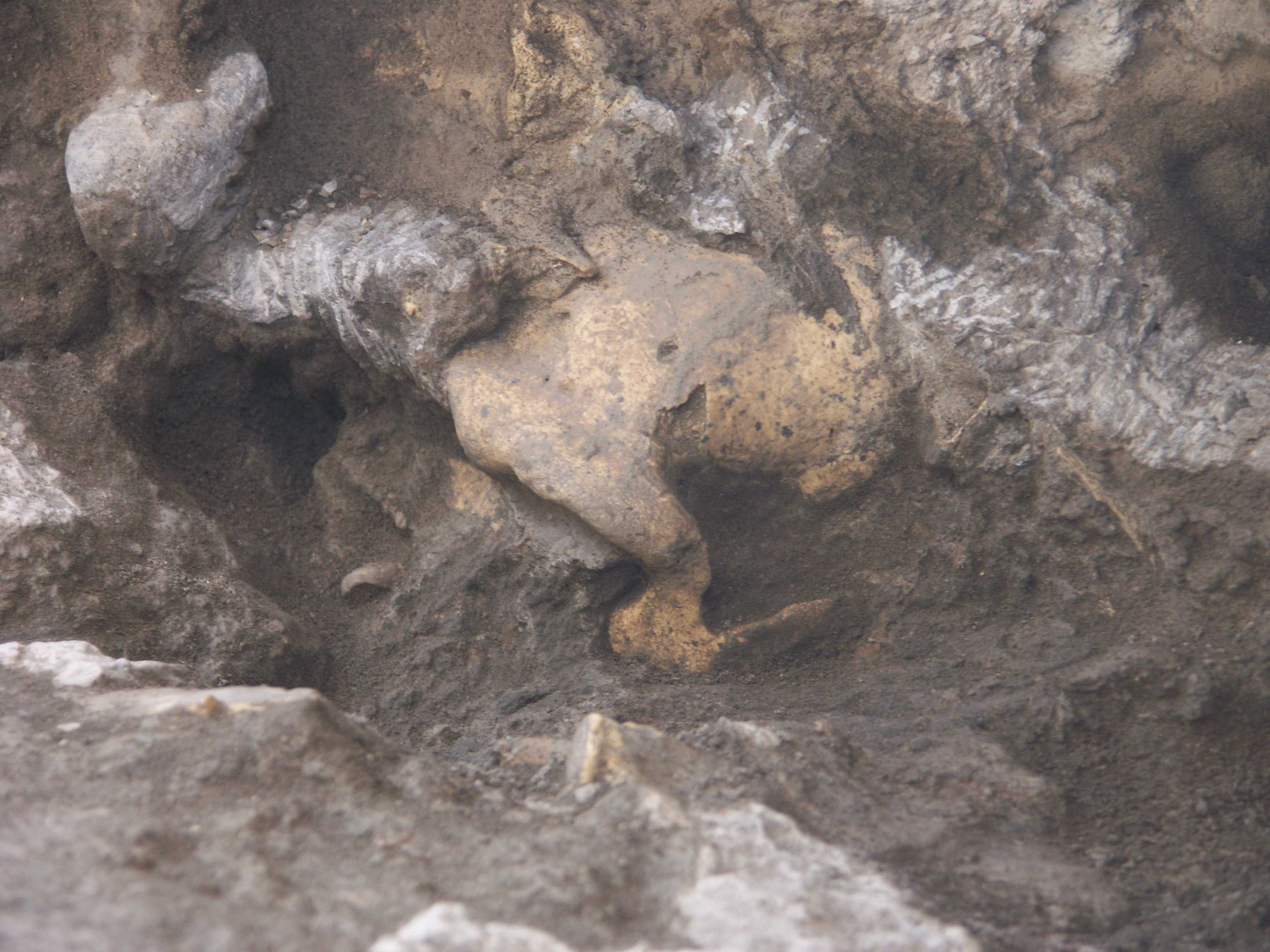
Dmanisi Skull 5 (D4500) at the time of discovery in 2005

More discoveries followed. In 2000, another hominin jaw (D2600) was discovered, this time at a slightly lower layer (i.e. older) than the rest of the fossils. This jaw was very large and had highly developed posterior molar teeth. The following year, Skull 3 (D2700) and its corresponding jaw (D2735) was discovered, almost perfectly preserved. On account of its erupting wisdom teeth, Skull 3 was determined to be the skull of a subadult. In 2002, the toothless skull of an old individual, Skull 4 (D3444, the associated jaw, D3900, was discovered in 2003) was discovered. Both Skull 3 and Skull 4 were noted as preserving a series of very primitive characteristics. The final skull, Skull 5 (D4500), was discovered in 2005. The skull matched the jaw found in 2000 and the two were concluded as having come from the same individual. The skulls were significant not only in their set of unique features. Skull 5 was the first found completely preserved adult hominin skull from the Early Pleistocene, and Skull 4 is the only toothless hominin discovered in such early sediments.

In addition to the skulls, about a hundred postcranial remains have been discovered. The first postcranial fossil discovered was a third metatarsal bone, recovered in 1997. Postcranial fossils comprise bones from all parts of the body and include parts of the arms, legs, axial skeleton (vertebrae and ribs) and feet. The bones, some of them confidently associated with Skull 3, are from both adolescent and adult individuals.

Together, the fossils at Dmanisi represent the most complete and richest collection of early Homo fossils at a single site with a comparable temporal context. The variability in age (i.e. Skull 3 being subadult and Skull 4 being significantly older) and presumably sex also gives unique insight into the variability in early populations of Homo.

The Dmanisi Skulls
Image	Skull & specimen number(s)	Cranial capacity	Discovered	Published	Notes
	Dmanisi Skull 1 D2280	775 cc	1999	2000	Skullcap of an adult individual. Interpreted as male on account of the thick brow ridges and other minor skull features.
	Dmanisi Skull 2 D2282 (mandible D211)	650 cc	1999 (mandible in 1991)	2000 (mandible in 1995)	Gracile features, interpreted as the skull of an adolescent female.
	Dmanisi Skull 3 D2700 (mandible D2735)	600 cc	2001	2002	Skull of a young individual. Generally gracile morphology, but the upper canine teeth have large crowns and massive roots; making assessing its sex difficult. A handful of traits suggests an interpretation as male to be appropriate.
	Dmanisi Skull 4 D3444 (mandible D3900)	625 cc	2002 (mandible in 2003)	2005/2006	Skull of an elderly individual that had lost all but one tooth. Interpreted as male.
	Dmanisi Skull 5 D4500 (mandible D2600)	546 cc	2005 (mandible in 2000)	2013 (mandible in 2002)	Skull of an adult individual. Skull 5 is the first completely preserved Early Pleistocene adult hominid skull found. Interpreted as male on account of its massive and prominent cranial features.

=== Classification ===
The classification of the Dmanisi hominins is disputed and a discussion on whether they represent an early form of H. erectus, a distinct species of their own dubbed H. georgicus or something else entirely are ongoing.

==== Early attempts at classification ====
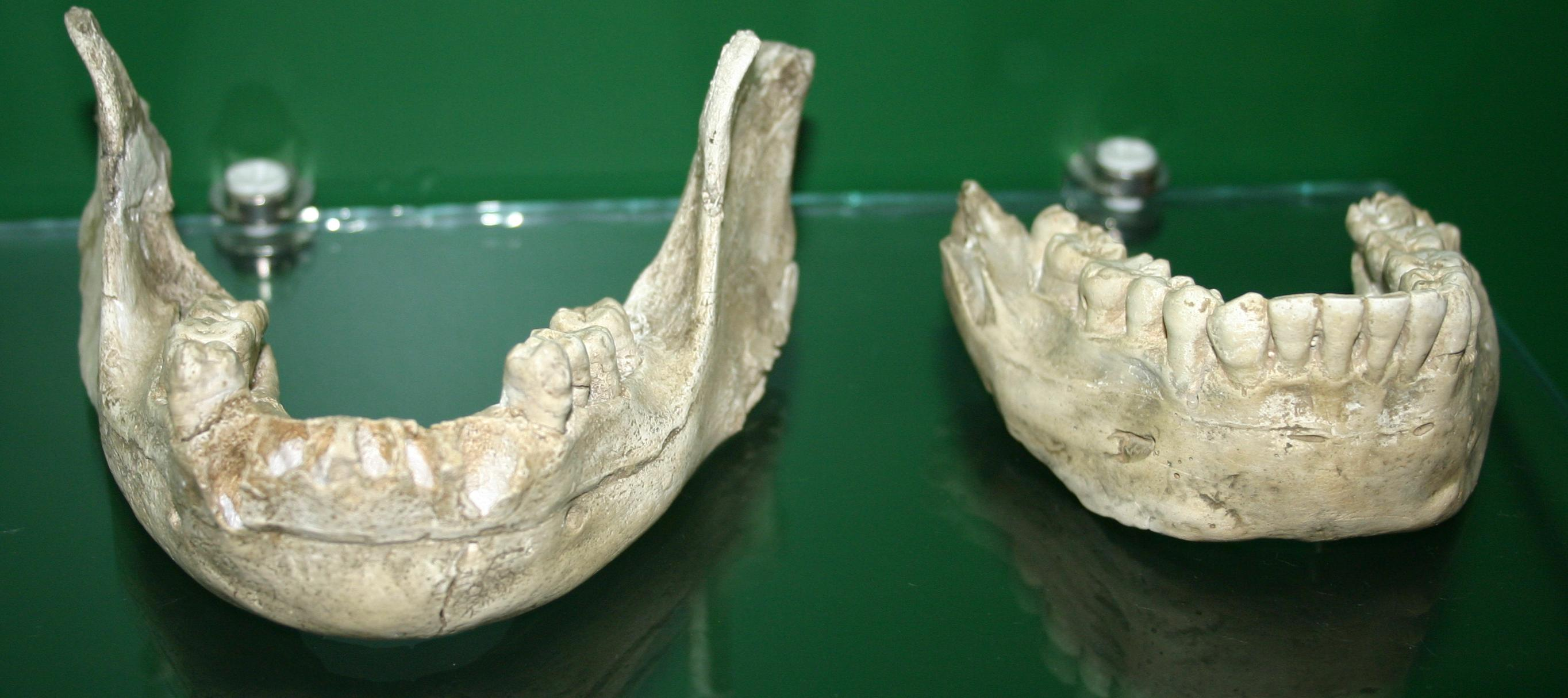
Replicas of the D211 (right, discovered in 1991) and D2735 (left, discovered in 2001) mandibles

The D211 mandible was described in 1995 by Gabunia and Vekua, who classified it as belonging to a basal population of H. erectus based on dental similarity especially with African specimens (sometimes called H. ergaster). In 1996, palaeoanthropologists Günter Bräuer and Michael Shultz made note of both basal and derived traits, and instead concluded the mandible came from a derived population of H. erectus, despite being so old. In 1998, palaeoanthropologists Antonio Rosas and José Bermúdez De Castro pointed out that such a mosaic anatomy is also documented in H. ergaster, and suggested the classification Homo sp. indet. (aff. ergaster)".

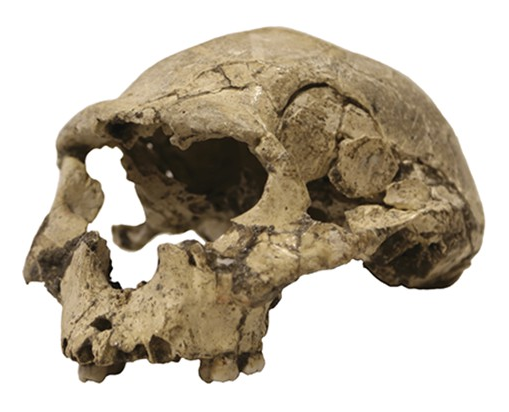
Dmanisi Skull 2 (D2282)

Gabunia and colleagues described Skulls 1 and 2 in 2000, and noted they were reminiscent of H. ergaster skulls. Numerous traits were noted as suggesting a close relation to H. ergaster, including the presence and morphology of the brow ridge, the overall proportions of the facial skeleton, the relative narrowness of the skull beyond the face (post-orbital constriction) as well as a comparable height of the cranial vault and the thickness of the cranial vault bones. The same features typically used to distinguish H. ergaster from Asian specimens of H. erectus were found to distinguish the Dmanisi fossils from Asian H. erectus; notably the lower cranial vault and somewhat thinner cranial vault bones in H. erectus and the smaller cranial capacity of the Dmanisi fossils. A handful of features were noted as present in the Dmanisi fossils and Asian H. erectus, but not H. ergaster, such as the presence of a supramastoid crest. Since these features also appeared in some African fossils, such as Olduvai hominids 9 and 12, they were deemed to not hold "any special phylogenetic significance". Gabunia and colleagues concluded by referring the Dmanisi fossils to Homo ex. gr. ergaster ("ex. gr. ergaster" meaning "of the group including ergaster"). Gabunia and colleagues stated that the combination of features made it a possibility that the Dmanisi hominins were forerunners of both later H. erectus in Asia and hominins ancestral to H. sapiens.

==== Classification following the discovery of further fossils ====
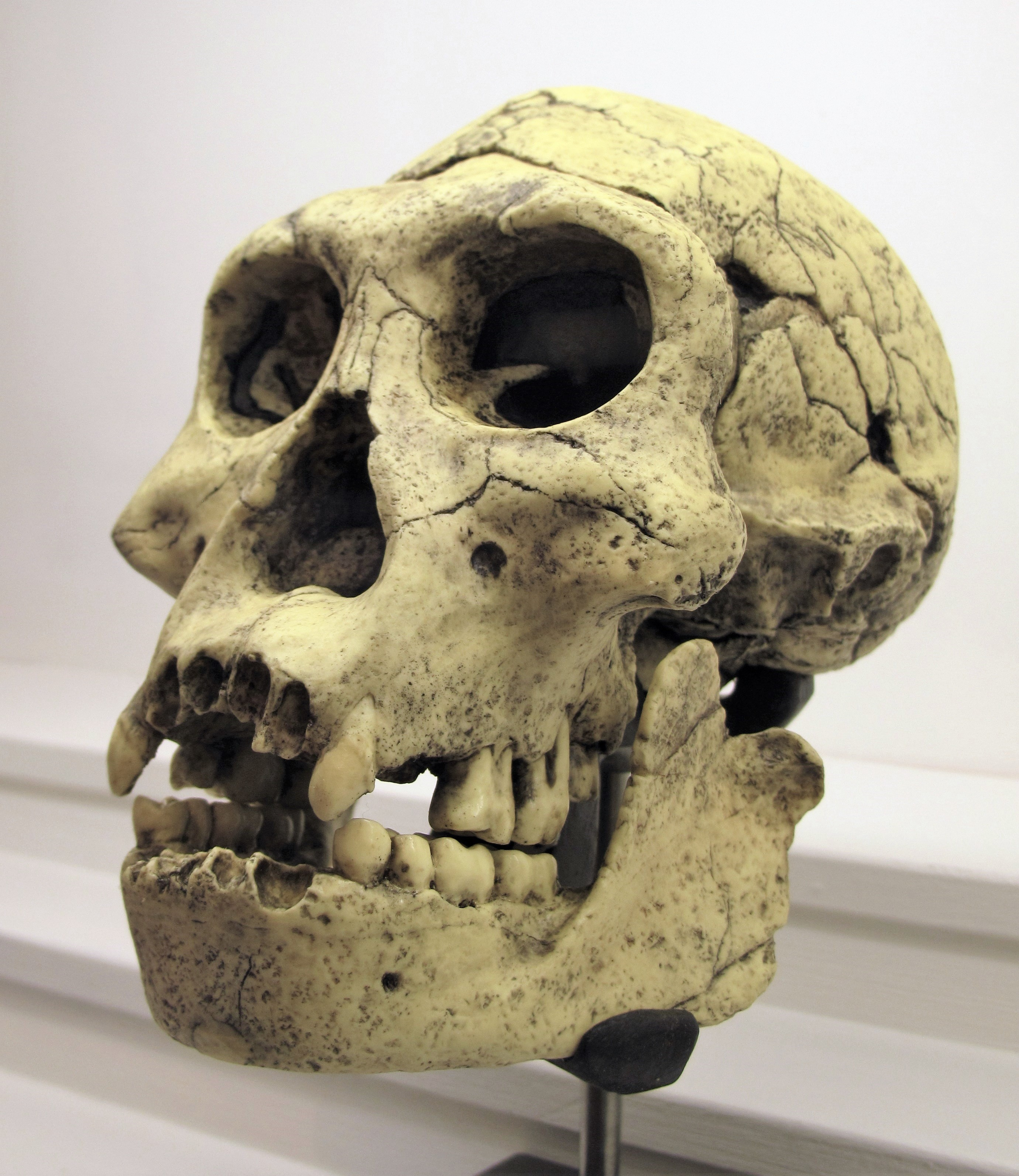
Replica of Dmanisi Skull 3 (D2700) and its associated mandible (D2735)

In 2002, Vekua and colleagues described Skull 3 (D2700), including its associated mandible (D2735). They conclude that, though the individual resembled H. habilis in brain size and some facial features, it overall is consistent with an incredibly small H. ergaster.

The D2600 mandible was also described in 2002 by Gabunia, Vekua and Lordkipanidze, together with French archaeologists and palaeoanthropologists Henry and Marie-Antionette de Lumley. The mandible differed in its large size, morphological features and teeth proportions not only from the previously discovered jaw at Dmanisi but also from all other hominin jaws found to date, blending primitive features otherwise seen in Australopithecus and early Homo with derived features otherwise seen in H. erectus. They considered it sufficient grounds for the creation of a new species, which they dubbed Homo georgicus. They assigned all the Dmanisi hominins to the new species, and believed the significant disparity in robustness was caused by marked sexual dimorphism. Gabunia and colleagues interpreted H. georgicus as a descendant of H. habilis or H. rudolfensis and an early species "near the roots of the Homo branch...foretelling the emergence of Homo ergaster". Palaeoanthropologist Sang-Hee Lee supported the classification of all the Dmanisi hominin fossils as belonging to the same species (though made no comment on if that species should be H. erectus or H. georgicus) in 2005, noting that despite the differences in brain capacity between the skulls, they were not more morphologically distinct from each other than individuals of different sexes in modern great apes.

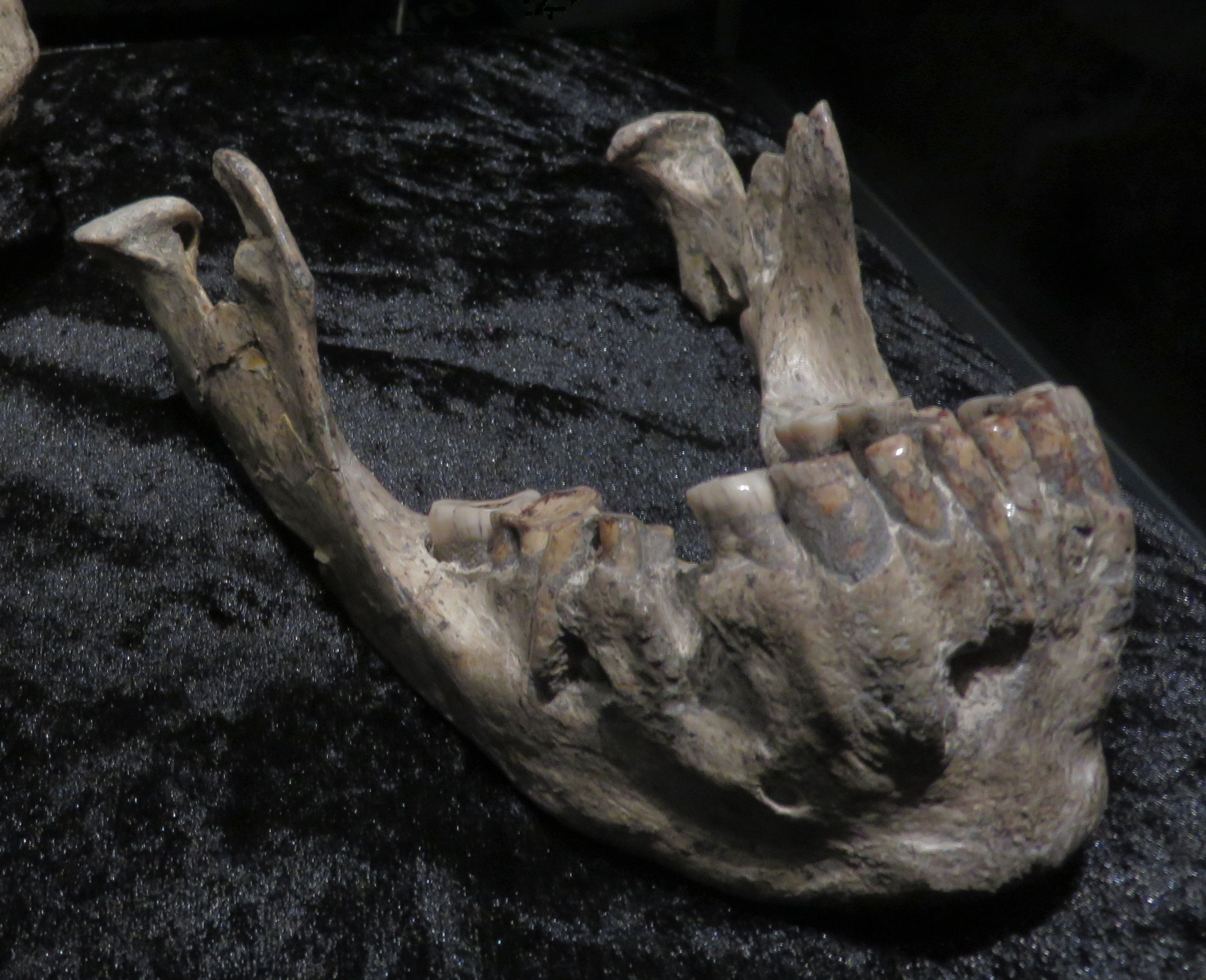
The D2600 mandible (later associated with Skull 5), designated as the type specimen of Homo georgicus in 2002

Lordkipanidze and colleagues described Skull 4 and its mandible in 2006, noting that it was similar to the fossils discovered previously and stating that with the possible exception of the D2600 mandible, all of the Dmanisi fossils were assignable to a single species. They agreed that the Dmanisi hominins were ancestral to later H. erectus, potentially even to later Asian subspecies. That same year, a comparative analysis of Skulls 1 to 4 and the D2600 mandible by palaeoanthropologist G. Philip Rightmire, Lordkipanidze and Vekua again concluded that Skulls 1 through 4 could be assigned to the same species, but that the status of D2600 was more questionable. They noted that though the fossils were similar to H. habilis in some respects, especially in size and (for some) cranial capacity, they shared far more features with H. erectus. In this respect, many of the primitive features could simply be interpreted as primitive retentions. Rightmire, Lordkipanidze and Vekua concluded that if some of the H. habilis-like traits, such as the size, cranial capacity and parts of the facial morphology, were considered plesiomorphic and primitive retentions, there would be no reason to exclude Skulls 1 to 4 from H. erectus. Though the others were unsure, Vekua supported the classification of D2600 as representing a distinct species separate from the rest of the fossils, preferring to keep its designation as H. georgicus. They noted that if future analyses suggested that D2600 belonged to the same hominin population as the other fossils, the subspecies designation would appropriately be Homo erectus georgicus, but that if it was distinct (as H. georgicus), a new subspecies name would have to be selected for the other fossils.

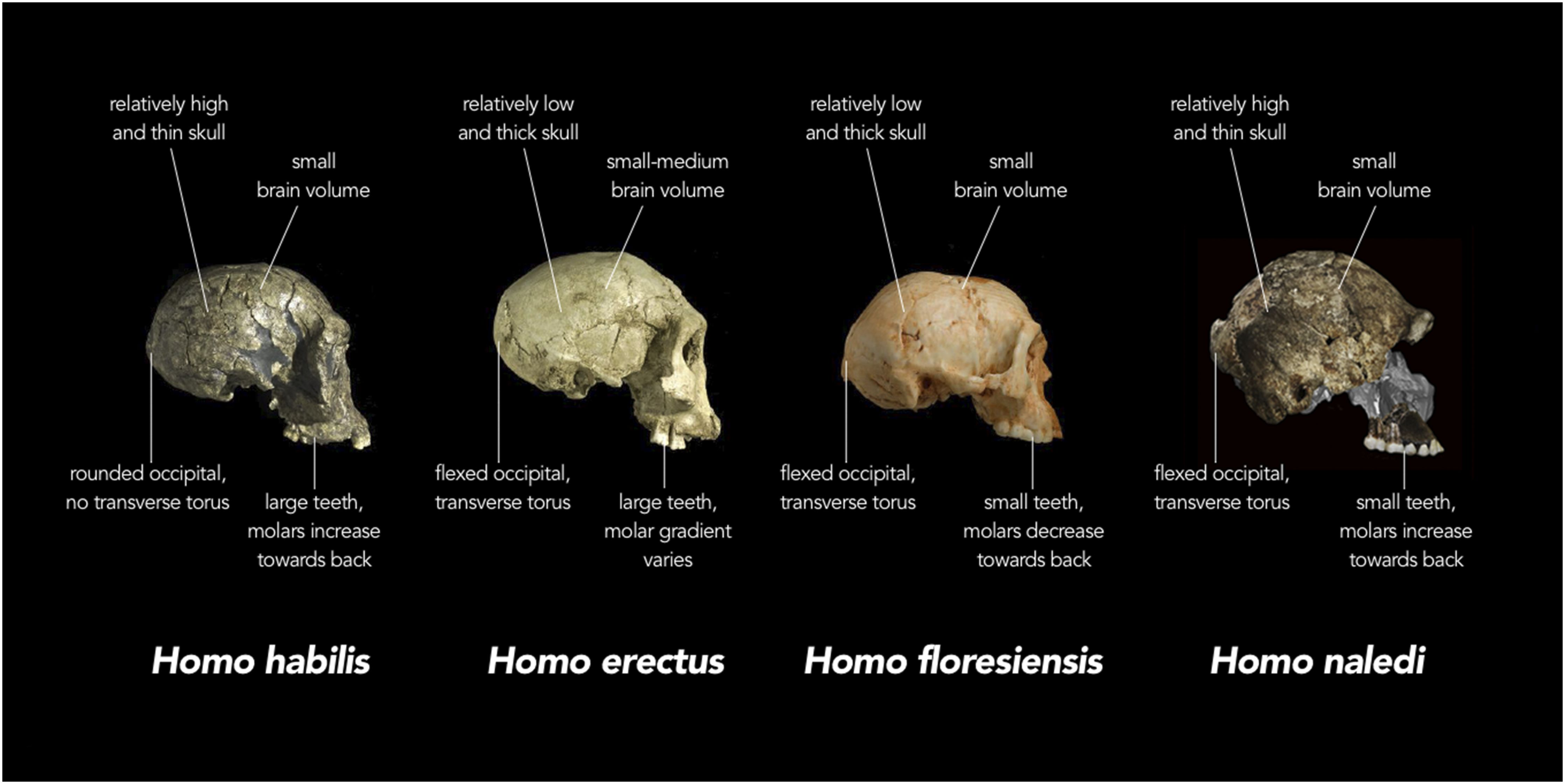
Dmanisi Skull 3 compared to skulls of H. naledi, H. habilis and H. floresiensis.

A 2006 comparative analysis of D211 and D2600 by palaeoanthropologists Matthew M. Skinner, Adam D. Gordon and Nicole J. Collard found that the degree of dimorphism expressed between the two mandibles was greater than expected in modern great apes and human, as well as in other extinct hominin species. They suggested two alternative hypotheses: either that the fossils represented a single taxon with unusually high sexual dimorphism whose inclusion in Homo was thus doubtful, or that D2600 should be considered as a representative of a separate, second species of hominins (i.e. H. georgicus). A more detailed 2008 comparative analysis of the mandibles, taking more anatomical features into account, by Rightmire, Lordkipanidze and palaeoanthropologist Adam Van Arsdale concluded that while the dimorphism between the mandibles was excessive when compared to modern humans, and to some chimpanzees, it was comparable to (or in cases, less than) the dimorphism between gorillas. They concluded that "in our view, there are currently no compelling anatomical grounds for sorting any of the Dmanisi fossils to other than a single species", but noted that this species would have possessed sexual dimorphism greater than later Homo. Preferring the designation of H. erectus, the researchers noted that although H. erectus is generally held to not be this dimorphic, some fossils, such as smaller skulls recovered at Ileret and Olorgesailie in Kenya and larger skulls recovered at Olduvai Gorge, Tanzania and Bouri, Ethiopia, could disprove this notion.

A 2008 analysis of the teeth of Skulls 2 and 3 and the D2600 mandible by Lordkipanidze, Vekua and palaeoanthropologists María Martinón-Torres, José María Bermúdez de Castro, Aida Gómez-Robles, Ann Mergvelashvili and Leyre Prado found that like other parts of the fossils, the teeth too showed a combination of primitive Australopithecus- and H. habilis-type traits and more derived H. erectus-type traits. The teeth of Skulls 2 and 3 were found to be similar, whereas D2600 somewhat diverged in the size of the teeth and in the morphology of its roots. However, H. habilis has the same range of dental dimorphism. In 2010, palaeoanthropologist P. James Macaluso Jr. concluded that Skulls 2 and 3 could comfortably be referred to the same species, but whether D2600 could also be referred to the same species as the rest was less clear.

==== Classification following the description of Skull 5 ====
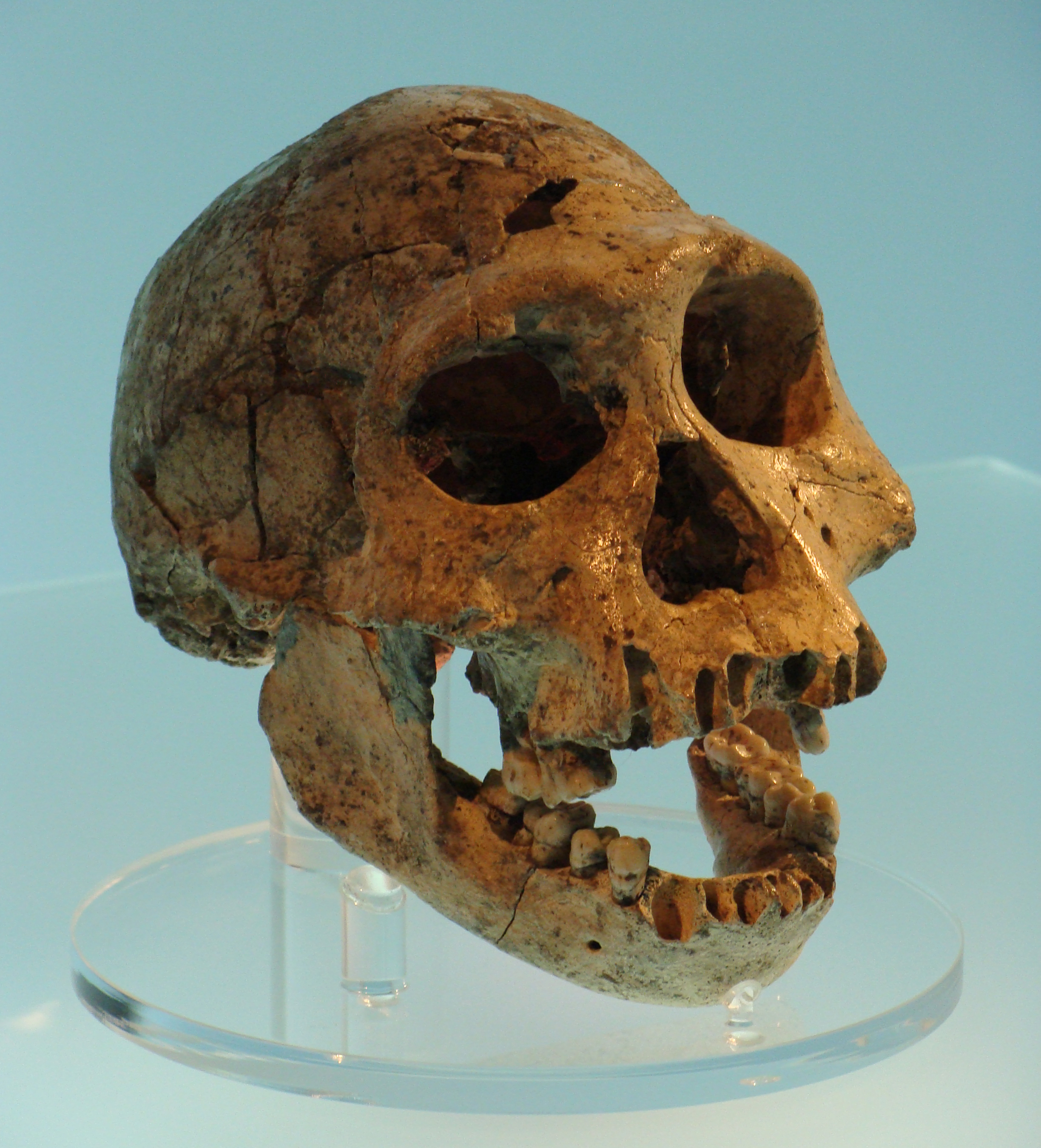
Another view of Dmanisi Skull 3 (D2700 & D2735)

Skull 5, recovered in 2005 and described in 2013 by Lordkipanidze and colleagues, was upon its description determined to be from the same individual as the D2600 mandible and together, the two fossils significantly expanded the morphological range of the Dmanisi hominin fossils. Lordkipanidze and colleagues interpreted Skull 5 as part of the same population as the rest of the Dmanisi fossils, as they came from the same general time and place, and had a range of variation similar to what is exhibited in chimpanzee, bonobo and modern human samples. Individuals in all four samples generally varied in size and in the orientation of the face relative to the braincase. Lordkipanidze and colleagues interpreted that the small-faced and more orthognathic skulls represented females and/or subadults and that the more prognathic and large-faced skulls represented males. The large degree of variation expressed in the Dmanisi fossils led Lordkipanidze and colleagues to suggest that the variation seen in other Pliocene and Pleistocene hominid fossils, typically used to justify several distinct fossil species, might have been misinterpreted as species diversity. Thus, the morphological diversity in contemporary African hominins, typically used to justify H. ergaster as a species distinct from H. erectus, might thus instead be due to regional variation in a single evolving lineage of hominins (H. erectus). With this in mind, the classification of the African material as H. erectus ergaster (a chronosubspecies rather than a distinct species) was suggested and since the Dmanisi hominins are believed to have originated from an early migration by the H. erectus lineage out of Africa, it was determined that they be best placed within H. e. ergaster with a quadrinomial (4-part) name; H. e. e. georgicus. The researchers considered it possible that earlier Homo, such as H. habilis and H. rudolfensis also belonged to the same single evolving lineage of Homo, though no morphological comparisons were made to test this theory.

Palaeoanthropologists Jeffrey H. Schwartz, Ian Tattersall and Zhang Chi responded to Lordkipanidze and colleagues in 2014, disagreeing with the idea that all five skulls were from the same species. Schwartz, Tattersall and Chi also suggested that the use of a quadrinomial name, H. e. e. georgicus, was invalid in zoological nomenclature. Most importantly, Schwartz, Tattersall and Chi questioned if the morphological comparisons were detailed enough to come to this conclusion and questioned the methods which Lordkipanidze and colleagues had used to determine what is and is not interspecific variation. The researchers did not see the fact that the fossils were from the same site and a relatively short time period as enough to determine that they all came from the same species and that the previous claims of Gorilla-type mandibular variation but H. sapiens/Pan-type cranial variation could not both be correct at the same time. They also questioned if all morphological differences could truly be attributed to age, wear and pathology. Several traits within the skulls and teeth of all the Dmanisi skulls were put forward as "potentially species-distinguishing features" and Schwartz, Tattersall and Chi concluded that at least the D2600 mandible, and thus Skull 5 as a whole, should remain classified as a distinct species, H. georgicus, writing that "to deny this hominin a distinct identity is effectively to deny the utility of morphology in systematics, a radical proposition to which few would subscribe".

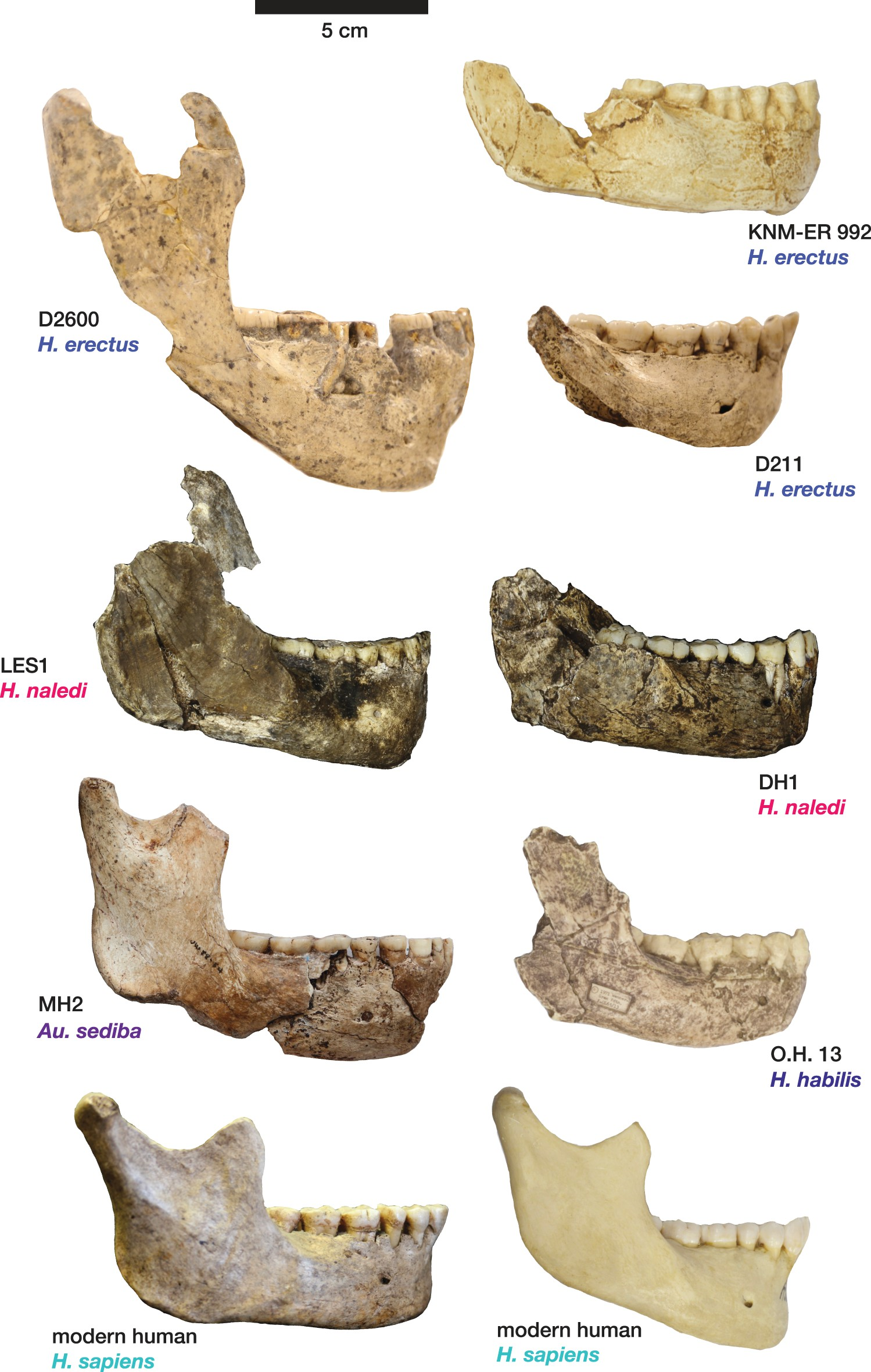
Comparison of the mandibles of various species of Homo; D2600 (belonging to Skull 5) and D211 (belonging to Skull 2) are featured

The Dmanisi research team, composed of those palaeontologists and researchers excavating at the Dmanisi site and studying the fossils, responded to Schwartz, Tattersall and Chi in the same year, maintaining that the fossils represented a single species. They noted that the distinction of H. georgicus, and the further suggestion that some of the other skulls might represent distinct taxa as well, would mean that Dmanisi would have been home to at least four different hominid taxa and thus "hold the world record in hominid palaeospecies diversity documented at a single site that extends over a mere 40 m^{2} (430 sq ft), and probably over a mere couple of centuries". The Dmanisi team wrote that Schwartz, Tattersall and Chi had deliberately ignored previous morphological analyses and also noted that character state variation in Asian and African Homo specimens, and the Dmanisi fossils, suggest that the fossil cannot be assigned to different species, accusing Schwartz, Tattersall and Chi of effectively denying the morphological evidence from the Dmanisi fossils that did not fit with their hypothesis. One of the primary distinguishing features noted by Schwartz, Tattersall and Chi, the number of premolar tooth roots, was pointed out as not actually carrying taxonomical significance since modern Sub-Saharan humans exhibit significant variation in this specific trait. The name Homo erectus ergaster georgicus was also defended in that it was used to denote a local population of a subspecies, similar to how quadrinomials are used in botany. The researchers pointed out that although the use of quadrinomials is not regulated by the International Code of Zoological Nomenclature, it is not considered invalid.

A 2017 analysis of Skull 5 specifically, with comparisons to the other skulls and to skulls of H. sapiens, Paranthropus boisei and other archaic hominins, by the team reaffirmed that the variation between the Dmanisi fossils was not excessive relative to the variation in most other hominins, with some features, such as certain midfacial measurements, even being more variable in modern humans. Although certain traits were noted as setting Skull 5 "toward the periphery of the Dmanisi shape distribution", they concluded that "neither these differences, nor the proportions of the D2600 mandible, offer sufficient grounds for labeling Skull 5 as the 'holotype of the morphologically very distinctive species H. georgicus'". The results of the analysis, which compared the skulls to many specimens of both H. erectus and H. habilis somewhat questioned the current recognition of species-level diversity in early Homo in so far that the Dmanisi hominins were found to broadly share many similarities with both species. The researchers found that the Dmanisi hominins "cannot unequivocally be referred either to H. habilis or to H. erectus" and that there, in regards to early Homo, was a "continuum of forms"; Skull 5 appears to share many primitive features with H. habilis whereas Skull 1, with the largest brain, is more similar to African H. ergaster/H. erectus. This led the researchers to hypothesize that H. erectus and H. habilis constitute a single evolutionary lineage which emerged in Africa and later spread throughout Eurasia. Phylogenetically, the Dmanisi population was suggested to represent a part of an anagenetic sequence, descended from H. habilis and ancestral to later H. erectus, placed near the base of the H. erectus lineage and already differentiated from H. habilis.

==== Phylogenetic systematics ====
Below is a cladogram of Homo based on the phylogenetic analysis conducted by Feng et al. (2025):

- - Homo habilis
  - - Stw 53
    - - - Homo ergaster (Turkana boy)
        - - OH 9
          - Dmanisi
      - - Homo naledi
        - - Homo floresiensis
          - - Homo erectus sensu stricto
            - - Homo heidelbergensis
              - - Narmada
                - - Xuchang
                  - - Homo neanderthalensis
                    - - Homo sapiens
                      - - Homo antecessor
                        - Homo longi

== Chronology and geography ==
Successive dispersals of Homo ergaster/Homo erectus (yellow), Homo neanderthalensis (ochre) and Homo sapiens (red).

The timing of the first archaic human migration out of Africa and the identity of the hominin species that undertook this migration are controversial. This derives from the sparse Early Pleistocene hominin fossil record outside of Africa. Before the discovery of the Dmanisi skulls, the earliest known hominin fossils in Europe and Asia were either too incomplete and fragmentary to be reliably identified at the species level or exhibited morphological traits specific to the region where they were recovered. Furthermore, most of the sites where these fossils were recovered preserved geological contexts that could not be reliably dated. Because of this, there was some debate in regards to if archaic humans spread from Africa in the Late Pliocene or Early Pleistocene as the result of a web of ecomorphological factors, or around 1 million years ago as the result of technological innovations such as the Acheulean tool culture.

The Dmanisi hominins represent the earliest known hominins in Eurasia. The Pleistocene sediments at Dmanisi are deposited directly atop a thick layer of volcanic rock that has been radiometrically dated to 1.85 million years old. The contours of the Pleistocene sediments indicate that relatively little time passed between the deposition of this volcanic rocks and the deposition of the newer sediments. Through palaeomagnetic analyses it has been determined that the sediments are probably about 1.77 million years old, deposited in the earliest Upper Matuyama chron. The fossils of other animals found at the site, such as the rodent Mimomys (which is only known to have lived from 2.0 to 1.6 million years ago), reinforces this date.

In 2010, the hominin-bearing level of the Dmanisi fossil site was dated through argon–argon dating as 1.81 ± 0.03 million years old, only slightly younger than the underlying layer of volcanic rock. This earlier date contradicted the previous 1.77 million year old estimate based on palaeomagnetic data. Since the D2600 jaw was found in a slightly lower layer, it was considered possible that this particular fossil was even earlier in age, but since there were no estimates of the sedimentation rate at the site, there could also only be a few millennia separating the jaw from the rest of the fossils. Stone tools found at Dmanisi site range in age from 1.85 million years old to 1.78 million years old, suggesting that hominins inhabited the site throughout the time between the two estimated ages of the fossils themselves.

The nearby site of Orozmani at 1,250 m above sea level — dated by argon isotopes to approximately 1.8 million years ago and systematically excavated since 2019 — has yielded a hominin premolar, Oldowan-style stone tools, and hundreds of faunal remains, demonstrating hominin activity in the upland setting in the immediate neighborhood of Dmanisi.

In the late Pliocene and Early Pleistocene, Georgia may have acted as a refuge for hominin groups living in regions of diminishing resources. The environment at Dmanisi would have been favourable to hominins due to the region's physical geography, including a temperate and varied environment and the fact that the Greater Caucasus mountain range served as a barrier for air masses from the north. They would probably have reached Georgia through the Levantine corridor, which already existed at this time. They may have established a foothold at Dmanisi before expanding elsewhere, since similar-aged animal fossils are present at sites in Romania, the Balkans and even Spain, some accompanied by stone tools reminiscent of those found at Dmanisi.

== Anatomy ==
=== Skull ===
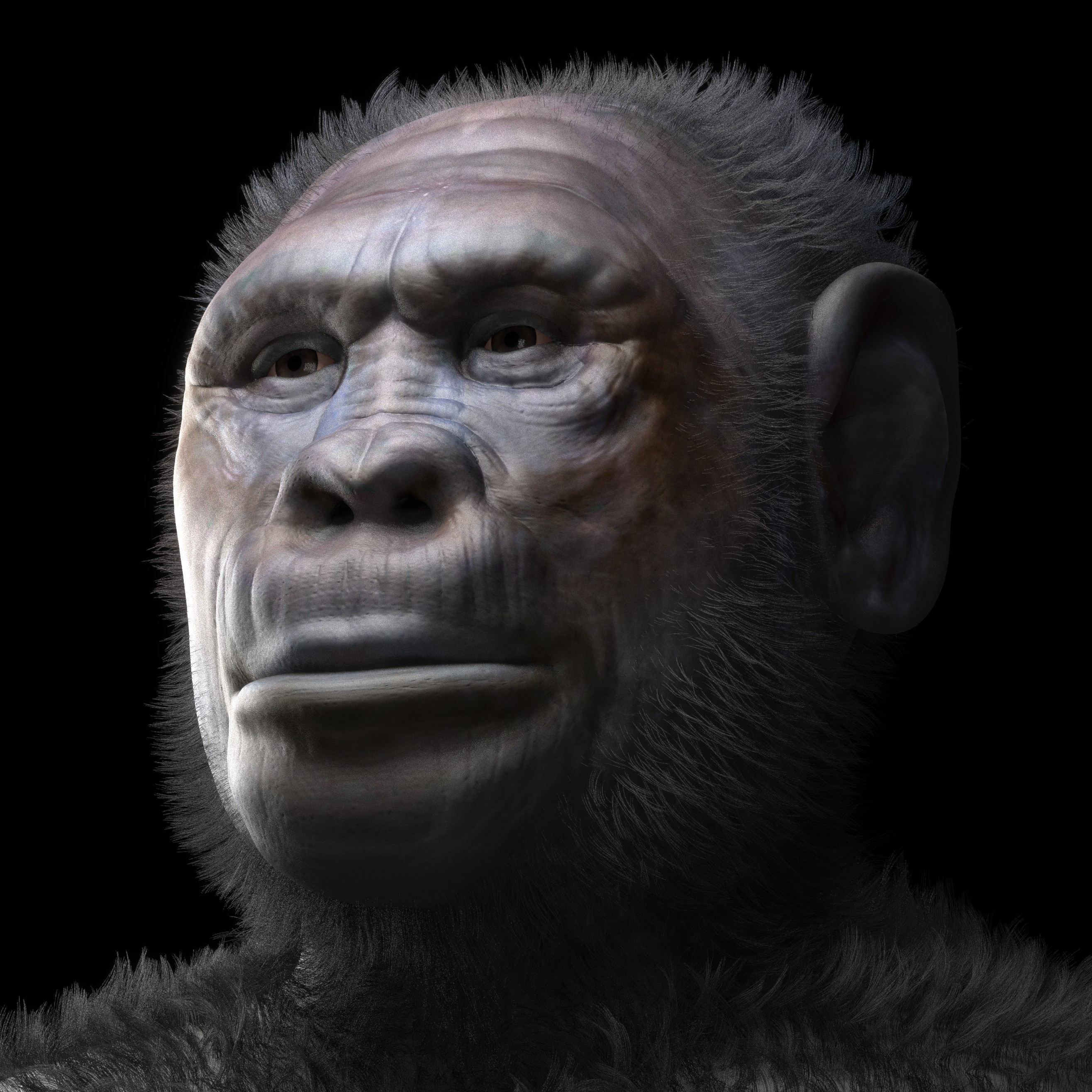
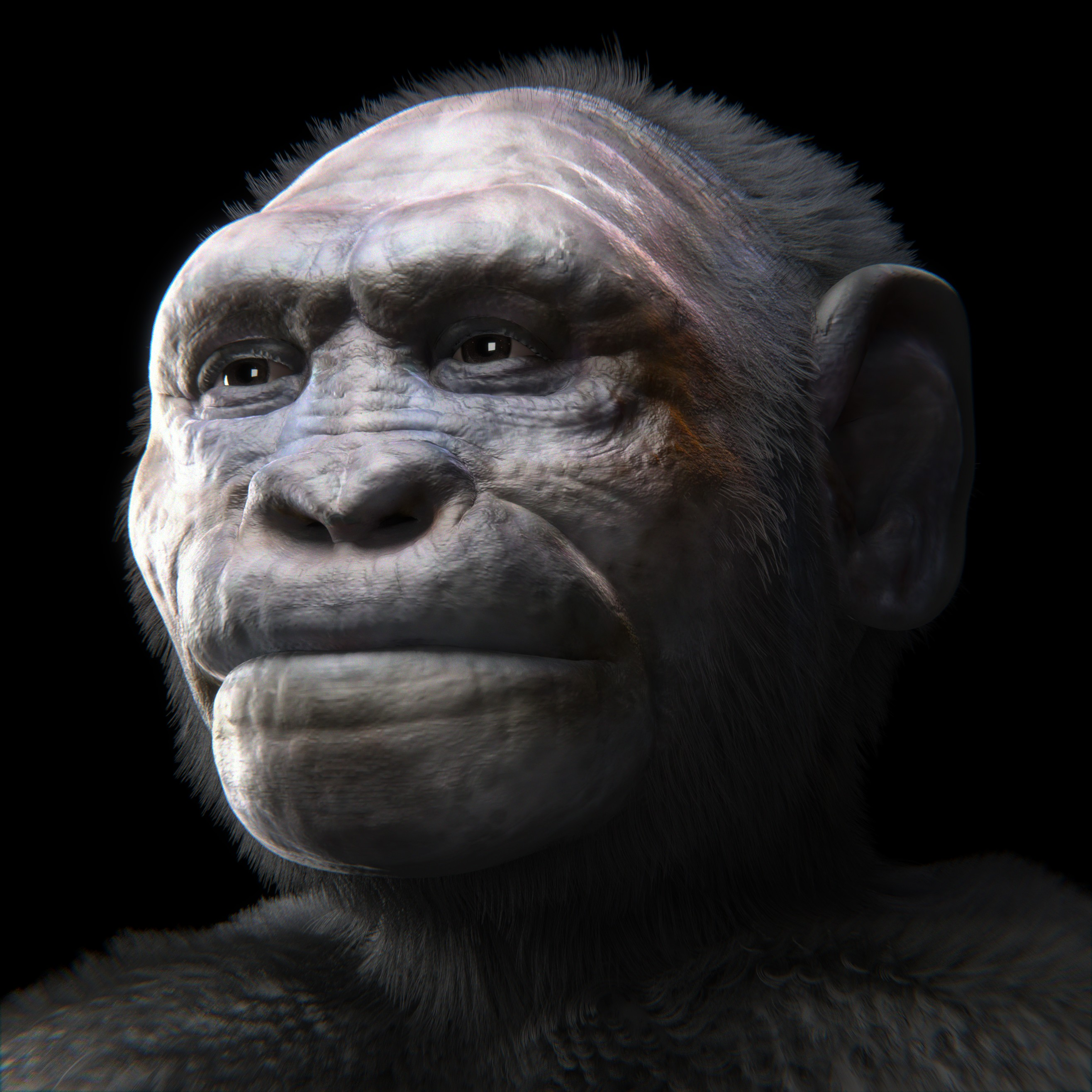
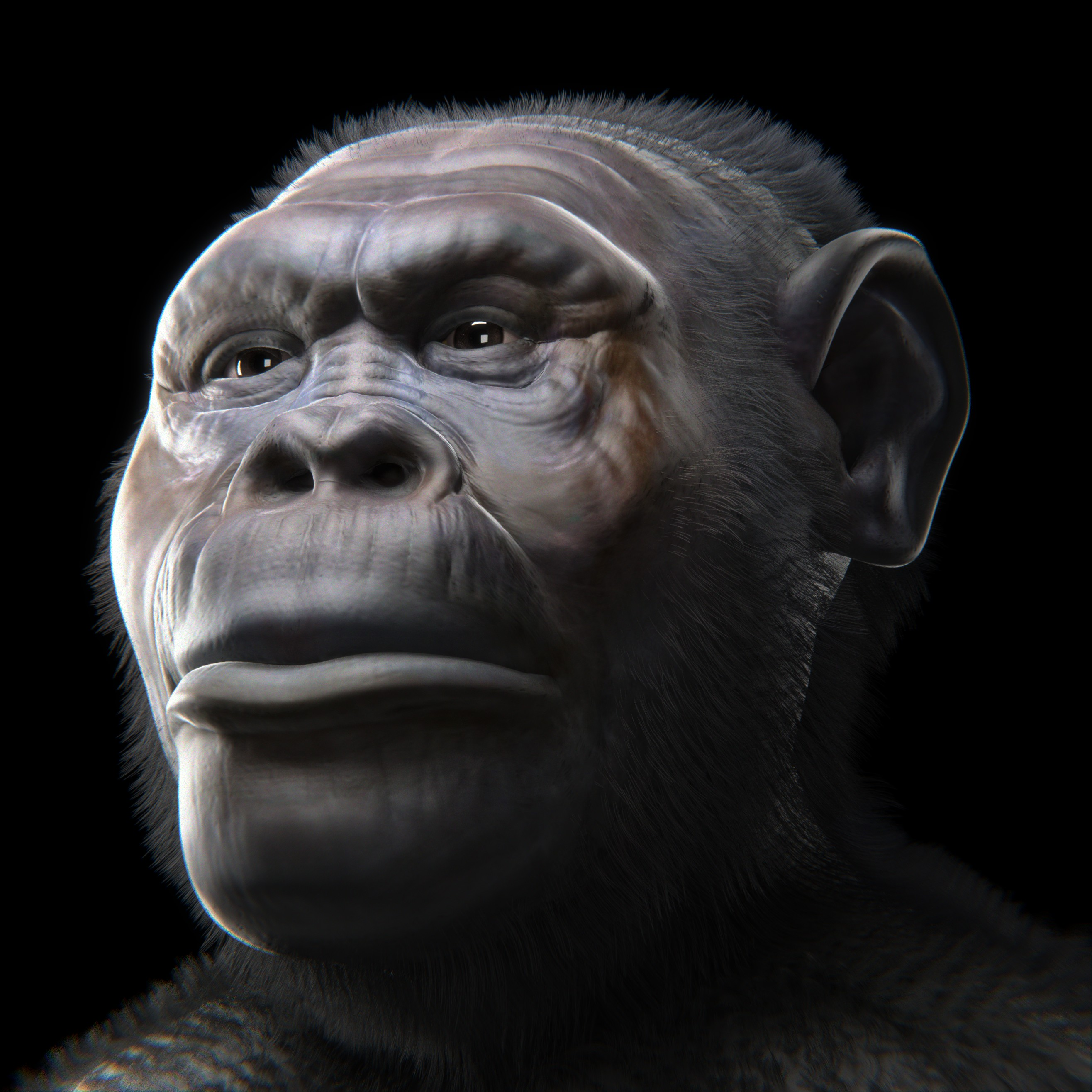
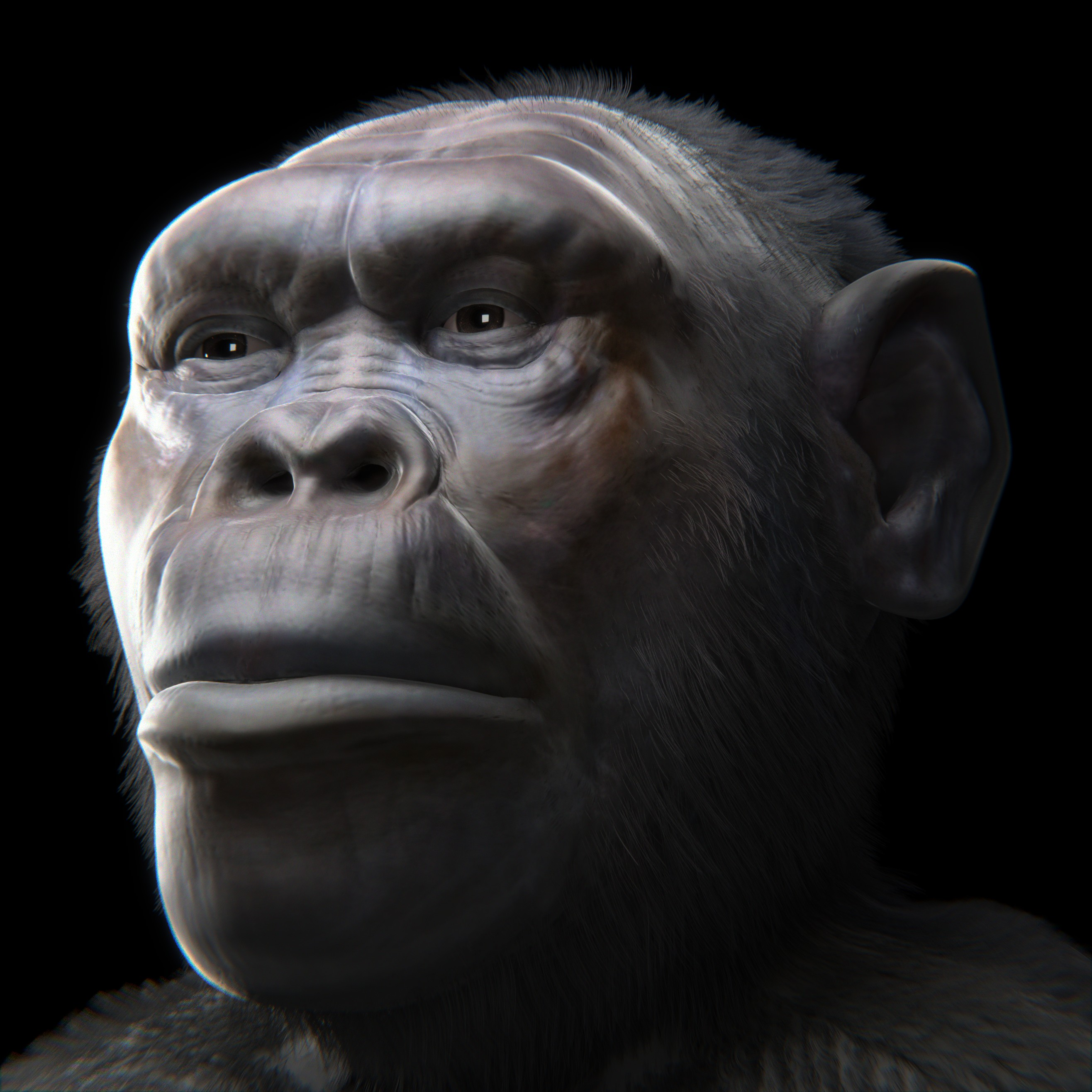
Facial reconstructions of the Dmanisi hominins, based on Skull 3 (top left), Skull 4 (top right), Skull 2 (bottom left) and Skull 5 (bottom right)

The cranial capacity of the Dmanisi hominins ranges from 546 to 775 cc, with an average of 631 cc. As such, their brain size overlaps with that of H. habilis (c. 548–680 cc) and falls below the standard cranial capacity otherwise ascribed to H. erectus and H. ergaster (800–1000 cc). The encephalization quotient (brain-to-body-mass ratio) of the Dmanisi hominins (based on Skulls 1 to 4) is in the range of 2.6–3.1, at the lower end of estimates for H. ergaster/H. erectus and more similar to H. habilis and australopithecines. The encephalization quotient of Skull 5 was estimated at 2.4, within the range of variation for Australopithecus. There are several features that distinguish the Dmanisi hominins from early Homo such as H. habilis, including the well-developed brow ridge, sagittal keels, large orbits, the premolar teeth in the upper jaw having single roots and the angulation of the cranial vault.

The only fully complete skull found at Dmanisi is Skull 5, which can be distinguished from all other known fossil Homo specimens (including the other Dmanisi skulls) by its large prognathic face and small braincase. The combination of large teeth and large face with a small braincase is otherwise unknown in early Homo, and the two features have previously separately been used to define different species. Had the braincase and face of Skull 5 been found as separate fossils at different localities, it is likely that they would have been attributed to different species. Despite the exterior morphological similarities to earlier Homo, the anatomy of its braincase is considerably more similar to later H. erectus.

Skull 5 indicates that small brains, large faces (though it is most pronounced in Skull 5, the face is relatively prognathic in all specimens) and a generally prognathic and robust morphology was all within the range of variation of the Dmanisi hominin population. Based on the skulls and the postcranial material, the Dmanisi hominins appears to have been small-brained individuals with prominent brow ridges, and stature, body mass and limb proportions at the lower range limit of modern human variation.

=== Postcranial anatomy ===
Prior to the discovery of the Dmanisi fossils, knowledge of postcranial morphology in early Homo had been very limited. Well-preserved fossils of earlier hominins, such as Australopithecus and later Homo, such as the well-preserved skeleton of KNM WT 15000 ("Turkana Boy"; a 1.55 million year old H. ergaster/H. erectus), gave little insight into early transitions in body proportions and stature. Australopithecus were small, about 105 cm (3.4 ft) tall, and had limb proportions intermediate between those of modern humans and those of other great apes, whereas the body proportions and stature of Turkana Boy were more or less modern. Postcranial fossils attributed to H. habilis and H. rudolfensis are fragmentary, and so the time and means of transition from hominins capable of bipedalism (Australopithecus) to hominins that were obligately bipedal (H. ergaster) remained unclear. In these respects, the Dmanisi fossils fill in a number of gaps.

Through calculations based on the size of their limb bones and a humerus (no complete skeleton has yet been recovered), the Dmanisi individuals were approximately 145–166 cm (4.8–5.4 ft) tall and weighed about 40–50 kg (88–110 lbs). They were smaller than H. ergaster in Africa, possibly either due to being more primitive (H. habilis was also smaller than H. ergaster) or due to having adapted to a different environment. Limb proportions (measured through the length of the femur relative to the tibia) in the Dmanisi fossils are comparable to those of modern humans, but are also comparable to some of the earliest Homo and fossils referred to Australopithecus garhi, dated to 2.5 million years old. In terms of the absolute length of the legs, the Dmanisi hominins were more similar to later Homo (including modern humans) than to australopithecines, though the length of legs and the morphology of the metatarsals in the Dmanisi hominins was not as derived as later H. ergaster/H. erectus (such as Turkana Boy). This might indicate that the evolution of improved walking and running performance was not a sudden change, but a continual process throughout the Early and Middle Pleistocene.

Humeral torsion (the angle formed between the proximal and distal articular axis of the humerus) influences the range of movement and the orientation of the arms relative to the torso. In modern humans, the scapula (which might otherwise restrict movement) is placed dorsally, which is compensated by a high degree of humeral torsion. Comparably, the torsion in the Dmanisi fossils is quite low, which indicates differing arm movement and orientation. It might mean that the arms would have been habitually oriented more supinely (horizontally) and that the shoulder girdle might have been positioned more laterally. Athletes that require high levels of mobility in their arms tend to have reduced humeral torsion, and the Dmanisi hominins might thus have been capable of a diverse range of arm movement. Humeral torsion is also low (or entirely absent) in H. floresiensis, which means that this might be a basal trait in Homo (though it is unclear how basal or derived H. floresiensis is). Either way, the functionality and morphology of the arms in the Dmanisi hominins appears to have been more similar to the arms of earlier Homo or australopithecines than to modern humans.

Overall, the spine in the Dmanisi hominins appears to have been more similar to the spines of modern humans and early H. erectus than to the spines of australopithecines. The fossil vertebrae recovered at Dmanisi show lumbar lordosis, the orientation of the facet joints suggests that the range of spinal flexion in the Dmanisi hominins was comparable to modern humans and the relatively large cross-sectional areas of the vertebrae indicates resistance to increased compressive loads, suggesting that the hominins were capable of running and long-range walking. Because fossils of the shins and feet have been found, it is possible to reconstruct the orientation and positioning of the feet of the Dmanisi hominins relative to their walking direction. In the Dmanisi hominins, the feet would have been oriented more medially (closer together) and load would have been distributed more evenly over the rays (metatarsals and toes) than in modern humans. Despite these differences, the bones recovered suggest that the feet were overall similar to the feet of modern humans. In 2008, palaeoanthropologists Ian J. Wallace, Brigitte Demes, William L. Jungers, Martin Alvero and Anne Su stated that they believed that the Dmanisi fossils were too fragmentary to infer the position of the feet (as medially positioned) with this much certainty, believing that more fossils, particularly of the pelvis and additional foot bones, were required.

== Palaeoecology ==
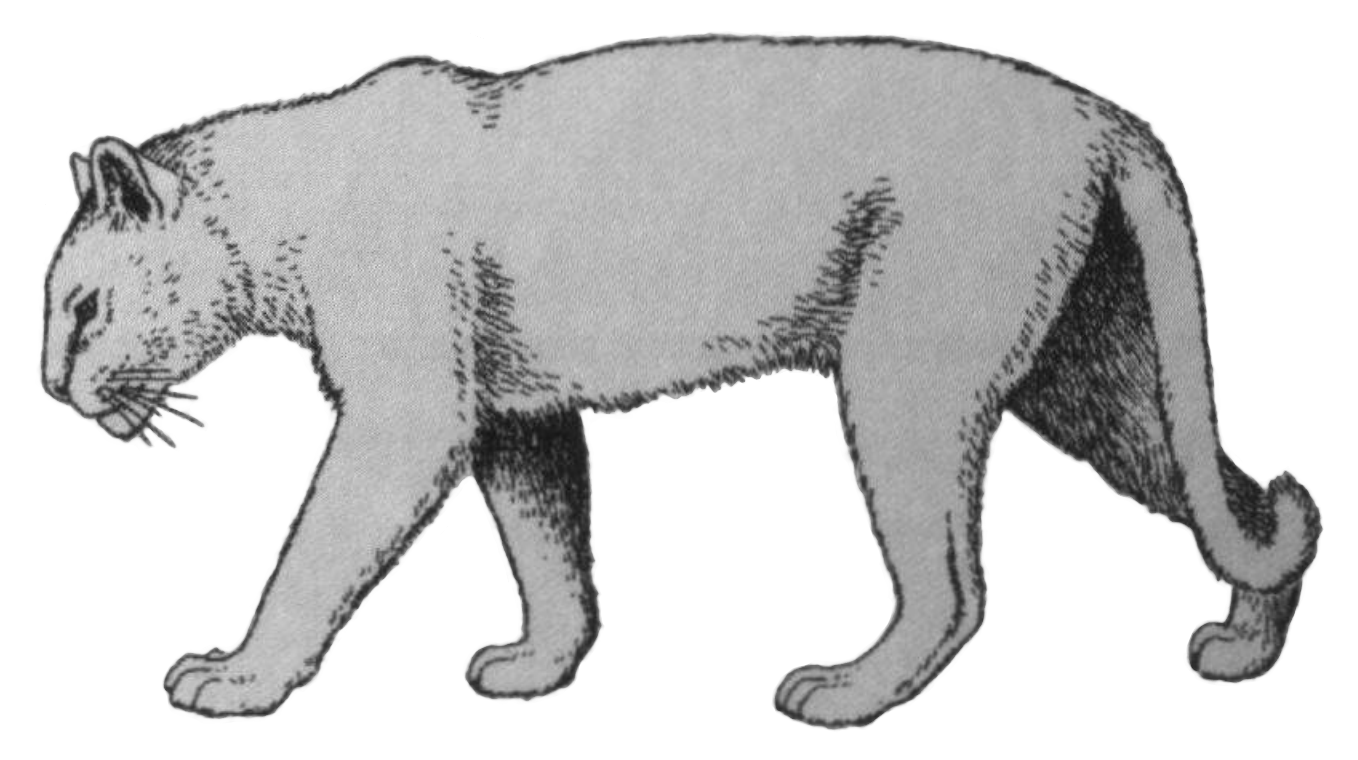
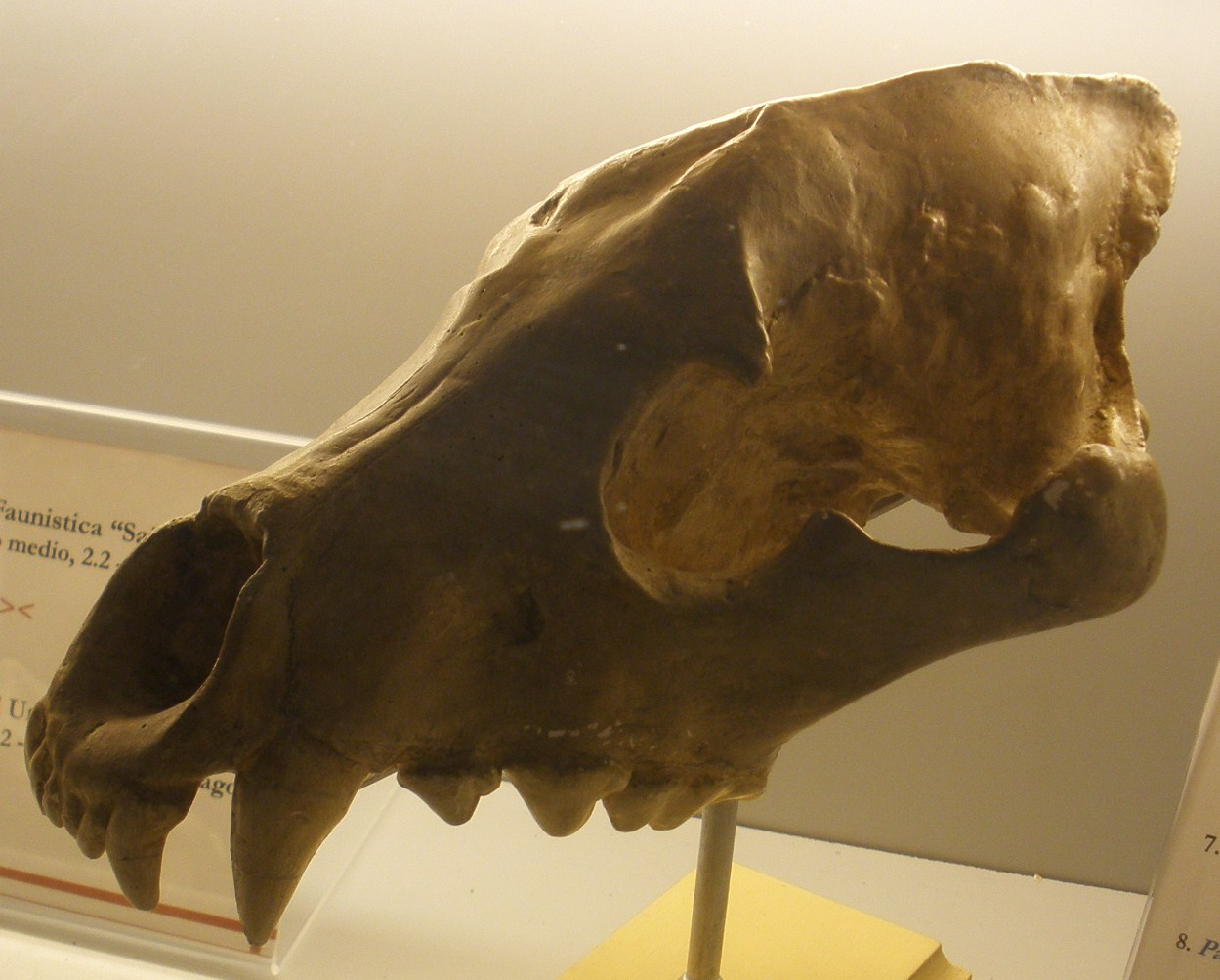
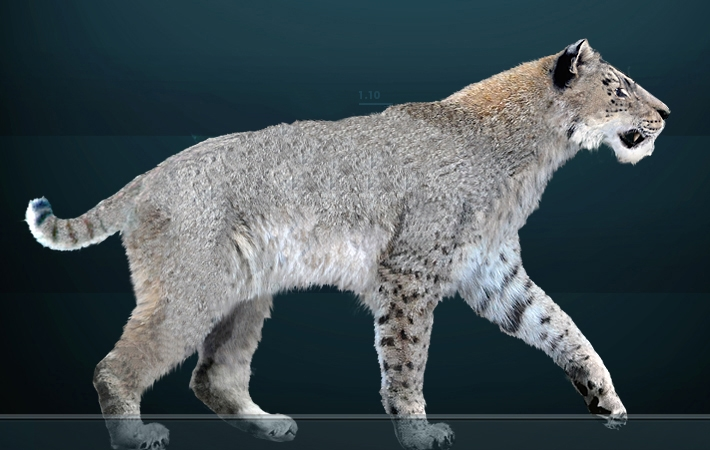
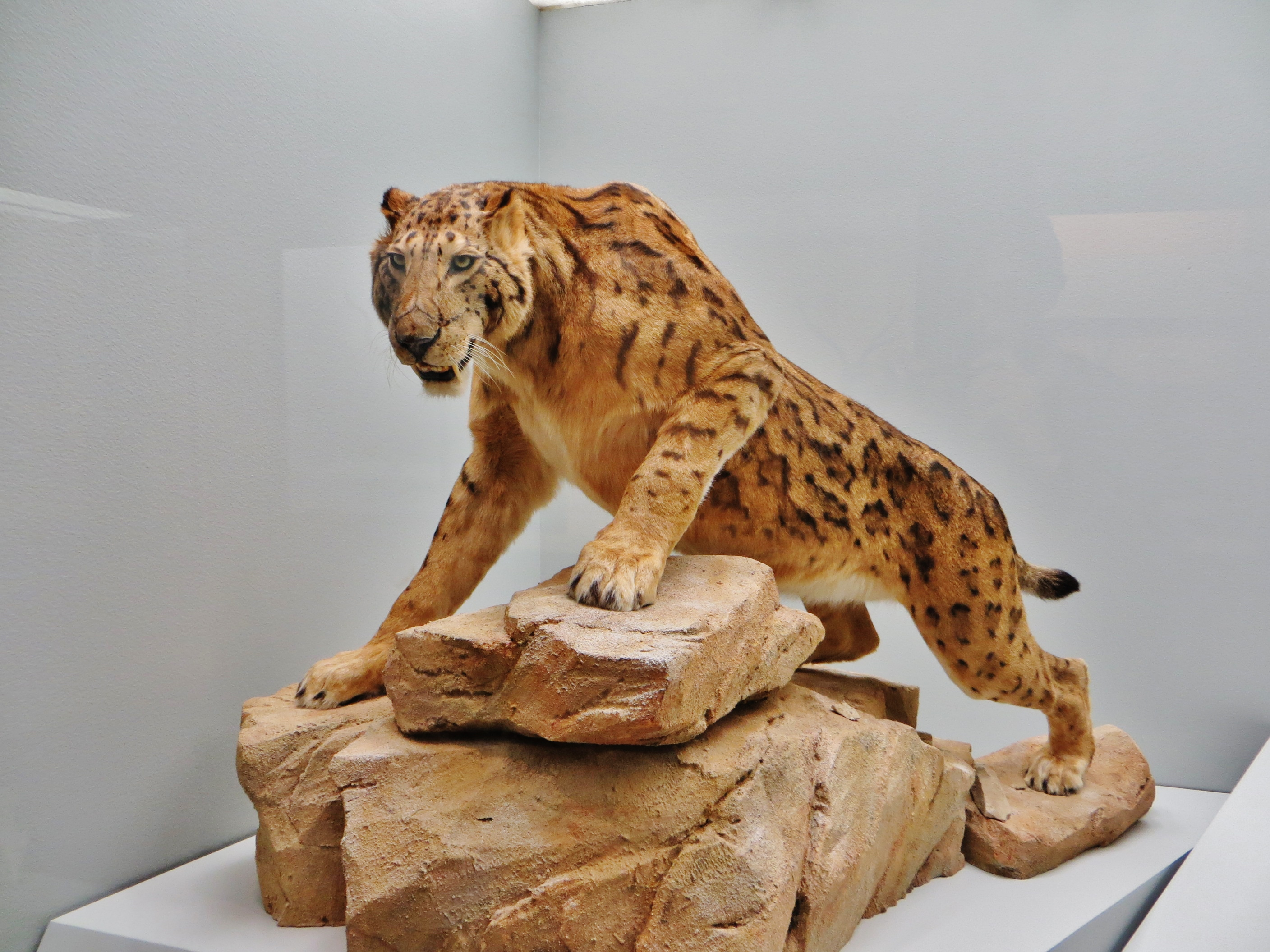
Several now-extinct large carnivores co-existed at Dmanisi in the Early Pleistocene, including large cat Panthera gombaszoegensis (top left), hyena Pliocrocuta (top right) and saber-toothed cats Homotherium (bottom left) and Megantereon (bottom right).

The fossils recovered at Dmanisi are all from a relatively short temporal interval and represent a 'snapshot in time'. With the sole exception of Skull 5 and its mandible (which are somewhat earlier in age), all of the hominin fossils are contemporaneous, with all of the fossils (including Skull 5) probably being deposited over a time interval possibly as short as 10–100 thousand years.

In the Pleistocene, the Dmanisi site would have been near a lake shore formed though the damming of the Mashavera and Pinazauri rivers by lava flow. The environment would have been temperate, relatively humid and forested; with woodland and gallery forests, open grasslands, bush lands, tree savannahs and rocky terrains with shrub vegetation. The environment, which would also have experienced cold winters, would have been quite unlike that of the dry and hot steppes of East Africa, where earlier (and contemporary) H. ergaster/H. erectus. Even then, Pleistocene Dmanisi was probably warmer and drier than present day Georgia, perhaps comparable to a mediterranean climate.

Though most of the preserved animal fossils suggest a predominantly forest-steppe ecosystem, some parts of the faunal assemblage highlight that parts of the environment would have been full-on steppe (as shown by ostrich and pika fossils) and full-on forest (as shown through deer fossils). The forests probably covered the mountain highlands and ground along the river channels whereas the flat river valleys were covered in steppe vegetation. Because deer fossils are particularly common (representing about 80% of the fossil found at Dmanisi), it is likely that forests were the dominant type of environment.

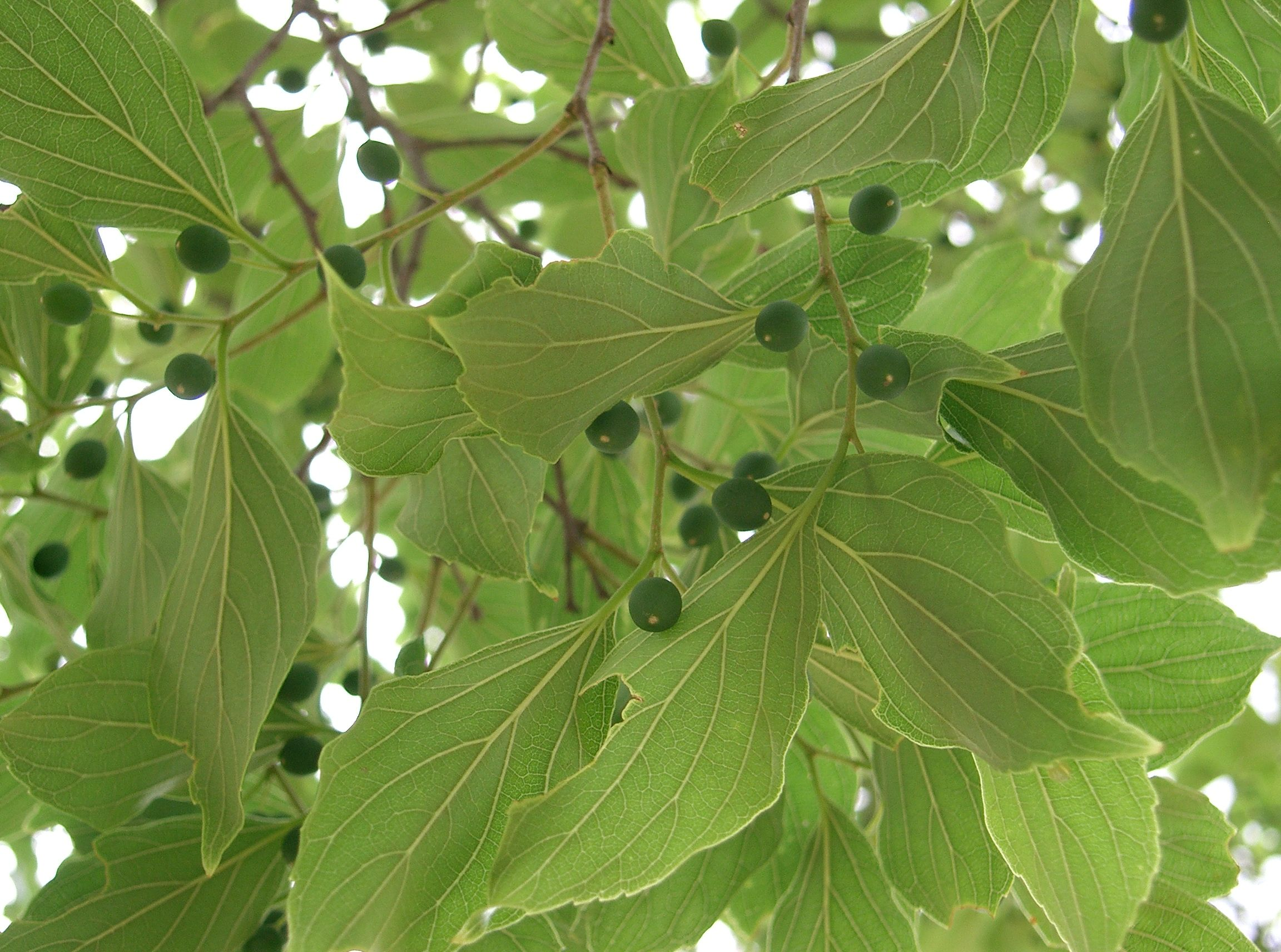
The Dmanisi hominins may have partly fed on hackberries (pictured), since hackberry seeds have been found in conjunction with the hominin fossils.

Animal fossils recovered in the same sediments as the hominin remains demonstrate that Pleistocene Dmanisi would have been home to a highly diverse fauna, including pikas, lizards, hamsters, tortoises, hares, jackals and fallow deer. Most of the animals found are Villafranchian (a European land mammal age) mammals and several extinct species are represented, including Megantereon megantereon and Homotherium crenatidens (both saber-toothed cats), Panthera gombaszoegensis (the European jaguar), Ursus etruscus (the Etruscan bear), Equus stenonis (the Stenon zebra), Stephanorhinus etruscus (the Etruscan rhinoceros), Pachystruthio dmanisensis (the giant ostrich), deer Cervus perrieri and Cervidae cf. Arvernoceros, the hyena Pliocrocuta perrieri, rodents Mimomys tornensis, M. ostramosensis and Kowalskia sp., Gazella cf. borbonica (the European gazelle), the goat-antelope Soergelia sp., the bison Bison georgicus and the giraffe Giraffidae cf. Palaeotraginae. The co-occurrence of so many large carnivores; Megantereon, Homotherium, Panthera and Pliocrocuta, highlights that the environment must have been quite diverse. Carnivore activity might account for the fact that all of the hominin skulls were found within just a few square metres of each other.

A large number of fossilised plant seeds have also been recovered at Dmanisi, mainly from Boraginaceae and beetroot plants. Most of the plants identified are modern species that are inedible, though some edible plants were present, such as Celtis (hackberries) and Ephedra. In conjunction with Celtis seeds being frequent at other hominin sites as well (notably Tautavel in France and Zhoukoudian in China), it is possible that hackberries (and also possibly Ephedra) were eaten by the Dmanisi hominins. The abundance of Boraginaceae seeds, often taken in later sites as an indication of human occupation, could mean that hominins were already having an impact on local flora at this early time. In addition to berries and fruit, the hominins were probably capable of exploiting a wide range of resources for food. Meat is likely to have made up a major portion of their diet, especially during the winters, when other sources of food would have been more difficult to come by.

A majority of the fossils (including all hominin fossils) have been recovered from the fourth of five layers at the site, with the upper (somewhat younger) layers preserving later sediments. Layers 2 and 3 preserve substantially less fossil material, preserving almost no carnivore fossils and no rodent or reptile remains. Although this might be partly attributable to preservation bias, it probably also reflects some palaeoecological changes, probably coinciding with the aridisation of eastern Georgia in the Early Pleistocene. The aridisation brought with it a considerable reduction in forested regions and the further spread of open vegetation and steppe environments.

The territory of eastern Georgia hosted critical ecosystems long before hominins arrived at Dmanisi. At Kvabebi, about 100 km to the east and dated to 3.07 Ma, a distinct Pliocene fauna — featuring giant hyraxes (Kvabebihyrax) and spiral-horned antelopes (Protoryx) — was once interpreted as evidence of African migrant fauna, leading to the assumption that early hominins followed pre-existing “African-like” habitats in Eurasia. However, renewed fieldwork in the 2000s has demonstrated that the Kvabebi fauna is discontinuous with that of Dmanisi and shows little similarity to faunas from African sites, instead representing an isolated refugium. In consequence, the Dmanisi hominins arrived approximately 1.2 million years after these local “African-like” ecosystems had vanished, indicating that they entered climatically transformed new landscapes.

== Culture ==
=== Technology ===
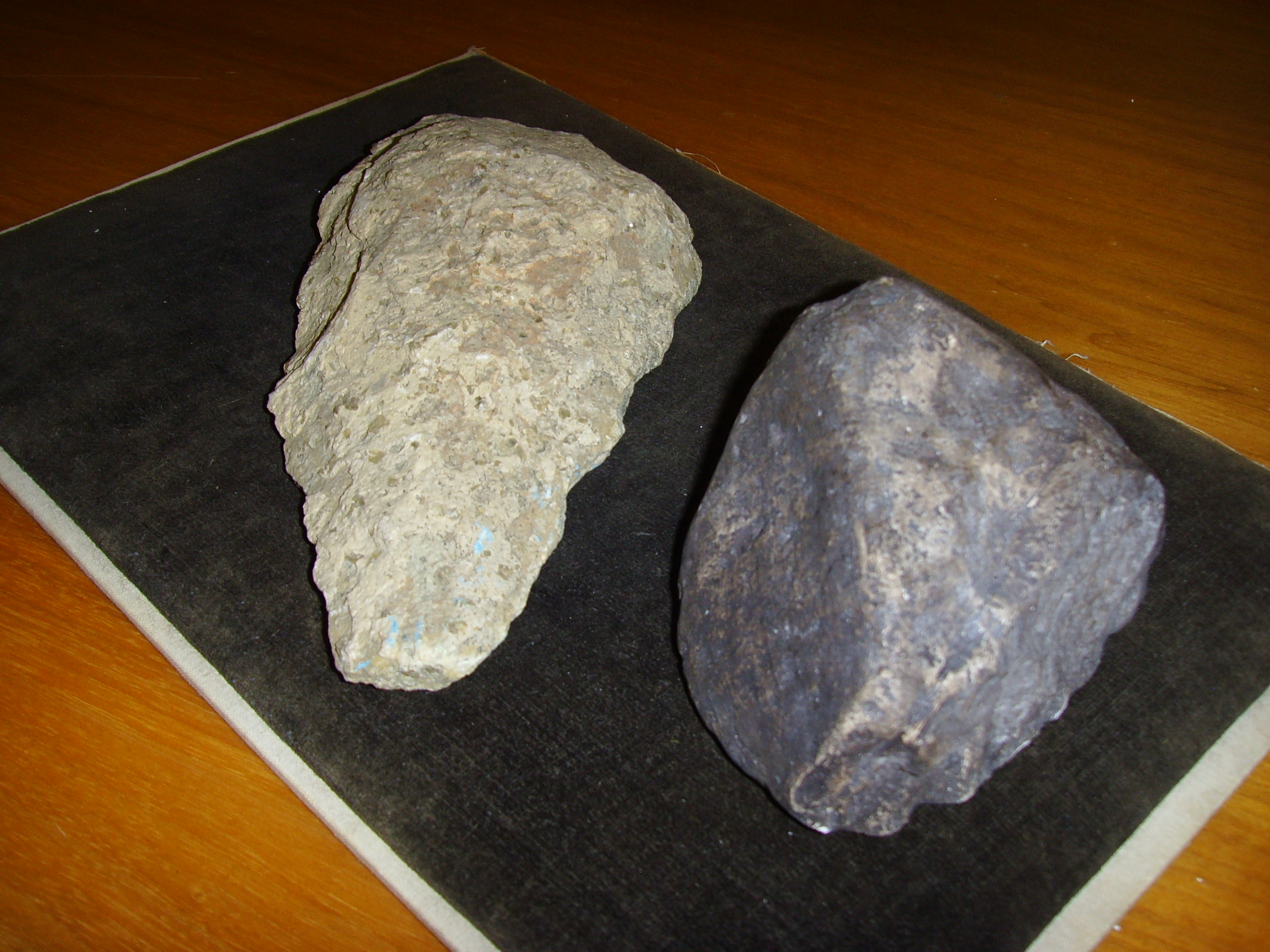
An Oldowan stone tool from Dmanisi (right, replica), compared to a later Acheulean stone tool (left)

Over 10,000 stone tools have been recovered at Dmanisi and their stratigraphic and spatial concentrations suggests a complex record of several reoccupations at the site. The tools found at Dmanisi are quite simple and are much the same as the tools of the Oldowan tradition created by hominins in Africa at least nearly a million years earlier. Most of the tools recovered are flake tools, but a smaller number of lithic cores and choppers have also been recovered. The raw materials to make these stone tools probably came from the rivers and outcrops near the fossil site. The presence of cores, flakes and chunks in addition to finished tools show that all the stages of knapping (shaping of stone to create tools) took place at Dmanisi. Although the technique was not very elaborate, quality rocks (such as volcanic, magmatic and sedimentary stones as well as silicified tuff) were used. The precise technique used differed from stone to stone, influenced by the shape of the initial stone. No new angles appear to have been created through the process.

In addition to the tools found at the site, many unmodified stones that must have originated elsewhere on account of their mineralogical composition (meaning they had not arrived there naturally, but had been brought by hominins) have also been recovered. Larger unmodified stones may have been used as tools for smashing bones, cutting meat and pounding flesh whereas smaller stones would have served other purposes, such as throwing. The large collections of manuports (unmodified stones moved from their natural context) recovered at Dmanisi are generally interpreted as stone reserves created by the hominins to avoid repeated visits to stone collection sites.

=== Social cooperation ===
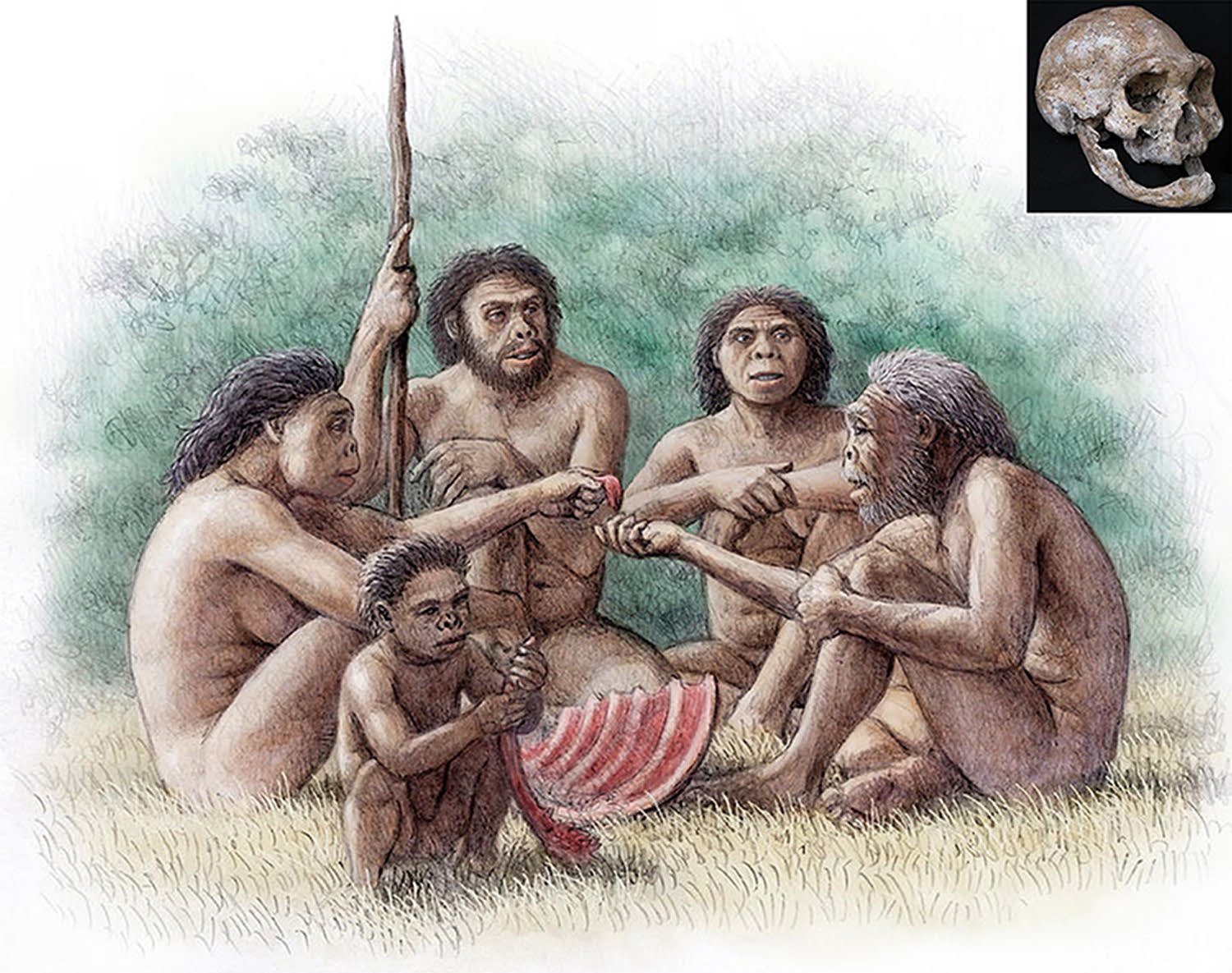
Restoration of a group sharing food with an individual who lived several years without teeth, by Mauricio Antón

Lordkipanidze believes that the small Dmanisi hominins may have employed aggressive scavenging, throwing small rocks to pilfer food from local carnivores. It is possible that this power-scavenging was done in groups for protection, and it may have led to the development of kinship-dependent social cooperation.

There is also indirect evidence of social cooperation in Skull 4, which is from an individual that had lost all but a single tooth by the time of his death. The old individual would have lived for a relatively long time after losing the teeth, indicated by the sockets of the teeth roots having been filled with bone tissue, something that is only possible if the individual in question is alive. Without fire to cook food, it would have been difficult for a toothless individual to survive for several years in a periodically cold environment. Though it is possible, through the use of pounding tools, that he would have survived on his own through consuming soft animal tissues, such as brains and marrow, a more compelling possibility is that he might have been cared for by other members of his species.
