= Abesalom Vekua =

- აბესალომ ვეკუა
- Born: 1 September 1925; Poti, Georgian SSR, Soviet Union
- Died: 19 February 2014 (aged 88); Tbilisi, Georgia
- Education: Tbilisi State University
- Known for: Research on the Dmanisi hominins and fossil mammals of Georgia
- Awards: Order of Honor (2001); Georgian State Prize in Science (2004)
- Scientific career
- Fields: Paleobiology, paleontology, paleoanthropology
- Workplaces: Institute of Paleobiology, Georgian Academy of Sciences; Georgian National Museum

Abesalom Vekua (Georgian: აბესალომ ვეკუა; 1 September 1925 – 19 February 2014) was a Georgian paleobiologist who studied fossil mammals and paleoanthropology in Georgia and neighboring regions. He participated in the discovery and study of the early hominin remains at Dmanisi.

== Life and career ==
Vekua was born in Poti in then-Soviet Georgia on 1 September 1925. He graduated from the Faculty of Geography and Geology at Tbilisi State University in 1956. That year, he joined the Institute of Paleobiology of the Georgian Academy of Sciences. He received a doctorate in geological and mineralogical sciences in 1969. By 2001, he headed the institute's Department of Vertebrate Paleontology. In 2009, he became scientific director of the Institute of Paleobiology at the Georgian National Museum.

Vekua chaired the Georgian commission for the study of the Quaternary period from 1981 and became president of the Georgian Theriological Society in 1990. He was elected a corresponding member of the Georgian Academy of Sciences in 2001 and a full member of the Georgian National Academy of Sciences in 2013.

== Research ==
Vekua's research focused on the paleobiology of late Neogene and Quaternary mammals and the vertebrate fauna of Paleolithic sites in Georgia. He studied fossil assemblages from Akhalkalaki, Kvabebi, Dzedzvtakhevi, and Kotsakhuri, and authored numerous scientific papers and twelve monographs.

In 1983, Vekua identified the remains of an extinct rhinoceros found in a medieval storage pit at Dmanisi. The identification revealed the site's paleontological significance; subsequent excavations uncovered stone tools and hominin fossils. Together with Leo Gabunia, David Lordkipanidze, and other researchers, Vekua studied the Dmanisi hominins and their environmental context.

== Awards and death ==
Vekua received the Order of Honor in 2001 and the Georgian State Prize in Science in 2004. He was named an honorary citizen of Poti in 2003. He died in Tbilisi on 19 February 2014.
