= Capra dalii =

Capra dalii Temporal range: Early Pleistocene 1.76 Ma

Scientific classification
- Kingdom: Animalia
- Phylum: Chordata
- Class: Mammalia
- Order: Artiodactyla
- Family: Bovidae
- Subfamily: Caprinae
- Genus: Capra
- Species: †C. dalii

Binomial name
- †Capra dalii Bukhsianidze & Vekua, 2006

Extinct species of mammal

Capra dalii is a fossil species of goat discovered in Georgia in 2006. It is named for the Georgian goddess Dali, who was considered the guardian of hoofed animals such as ibexes and goats. Fragments of C. dalii fossils were first located at the Dmanisi archaeological site, and are believed to be related to the west Caucasian tur, Capra caucasica. The species is believed to have existed during the Early Pleistocene, around 1.76 million years ago, making it the oldest known example of the Capra genus.

Based on the fossil fragments found, C. dalii is believed to have been a large Capra species, with horns that curved outward. Its teeth are similar to those of Hemitragus orientalis, another fossil species.

Some of the C. dalii fossil fragments are held in the National History collection at the Dmanisi Museum-Reserve, part of the Georgian National Museum.

== Bibliography ==
- Bukhsianidze, Maia; Vekua, Abesalom (2006-11-15). "Capra dalii nov. sp. (Caprinae, Bovidae, Mammalia) at the limit of Plio-Pleistocene from Dmanisi (Georgia)". Courier Forschungsinstitut Senckenberg: 159–171 – via ResearchGate.
- Charachidzé, Georges (1993-05-15). "The Religion and Myths of the Georgians of the Mountains". In Bonnefoy, Yves (ed.). American, African, and Old European Mythologies. Translated by Doniger, Wendy. University of Chicago Press. pp. 254–262. ISBN 9780226064574.
- Van Der Made, Jan; Carlos Calero, Juan Abel; Mancheño, Miguel Ángel (30 April 2008). "New material of the goat Capra? alba from the Lower Pleistocene of Quibas (Spain); notes on sexual dimorphism, stratigraphic distribution and systematics" (PDF). Bollettino della Società paleontologica italiana. 47 (1). Società Paleontologica Italiana: 13–23. Archived from the original on 17 July 2020.
