= Kvabebi fossil site =

- ქვაბების ფაუნა (Georgian)
- Location within Georgia Location within Asia Location within Europe
- 41°27′28.5″N 45°42′43.4″E
- Type: Paleontological
- Periods: Miocene
- Location: Mount Kvabebi, Iori Plateau
- Region: Sighnaghi Municipality, Georgia

The Kvabebi fossil site (Georgian: ქვაბების ფაუნა) is a Pliocene paleontological locality in eastern Georgia's Iori Plateau, known for its rich vertebrate assemblage that is key to understanding of Eurasian biogeography and early human dispersal. Dated to around 3.07 million years ago (Ma), it preserves a mix of Eurasian taxa and Miocene relicts from the Greek-Iranian province — a Late Miocene Eurasian biome hosting extinct savanna species. Research since 2009 has refuted earlier hypotheses that Kvabebi represented an "African bridge" for early hominin dispersal, instead revealing it as a dead-end refuge for ancient lineages.

== Location and discovery ==
Located at Mount Kvabebi on the southern edge of Georgia's Iori Plateau near the Magharo village, Signaghi Municipality, the Kvabebi fossil site was discovered in 1962 when geologist G. Avakov unearthed a lone vertebra. Between the 1960s and 1970s, the Georgian Academy of Sciences expeditions recovered over 800 vertebrate specimens from the Kura Basin's layered sediments — a trove later cataloged in A. Vekua's 1972 monograph. Renewed fieldwork in the 2000s by Georgian-Spanish teams reinterpreted the site with implications for understanding continental biogeography.

== Geological setting ==
At the base of Kvabebi's 170-meter-thick exposure lie marine mudstones studded with Caspian Sea mollusks like Avimactra and Cardium — relics of a time when the Paratethys Ocean flooded the region. Higher strata transition to continental sandstones, where two volcanic ash layers bracket the fossil bed at 40 meters depth. Here, disarticulated bones weathered by ancient rivers lie preserved, untouched by scavengers.

Paleomagnetic analysis pinned these fossils to reverse Chron C2An.1r, dating them to around 3.07 million years ago. This places Kvabebi contemporaneous with Ethiopia's Hadar Formation and older than Europe's last Hipparion horse sites. Critical biochronological markers like the three-toed horse Hipparion rocinantis and early deer Eucladoceros confirm Kvabebi's role as a pre-Equus ecosystem.

== Fossil assemblage ==
The site yielded 138 individuals across more than 23 species. Dominant Eurasian taxa included elephant-like Anancus arvernensis, sabertooth cats (Homotherium) and hyenas (Chasmaportetes) as well as fleet-footed deer (Procapreolus and Pseudalces), alongside canids like the raccoon dog Nyctereutes megamastoides and the ancestral red fox Vulpes alopecoides. The so-called "African" species were giant hyraxes (Kvabebihyrax kachetikus), spiral-horned antelopes (Parastrepsiceros), and gazelles (Gazella postmitilini). Initially, these were interpreted by Vekua (1972) and Dennell & Roebroeks (2005) as evidence of Pliocene migrations from Africa — a "faunal bridge" for later hominins.

The renewed studies by Agustí and Vekua in the 2000s revealed that the site's "African-affinity" species — including the giant hyrax Kvabebihyrax — were not evidence of Pliocene migrations from Africa as previously thought. Instead, these taxa were relicts of Eurasia's extinct Greek-Iranian province — a vast Late Miocene (11–5 Ma) savanna-woodland biome stretching from Greece to Iran. Also, Rook et al identified Vulpes alopecoides as the earliest known occurrence of this fox in Europe, demonstrating niche partitioning with coexisting canids like Nyctereutes and Eucyon. When aridification fragmented this ecosystem around 8–7 million years ago, species like hyraxes, antelopes, and specialized canids retreated to refuges.

Kvabebi fossil assemblage (Mid-Pliocene, ~3.07 Ma)
Taxon	Common name / Description	NISP	MNI	Biogeographic affinity	Notes
Kvabebihyrax kachethicus	Giant hyrax (sheep-sized)	11	5	Greek-Iranian relict	Descendant of European Pilohyrax; last Eurasian hyrax
Hipparion rocinantis	Three-toed horse	83	8	Eurasian	Last hipparionine horse in W. Eurasia; pre-Equus
Ioribos aceros	Bovid (local Leptobos relative)	234	28	Eurasian	Dominant herbivore; endemic to Caucasus
Protoryx heinrichi	Spiral-horned antelope	72	17	Greek-Iranian relict	Pikermian biome survivor
Parasirepsiceros sokolovi	Spiral-horned antelope	84	14	Greek-Iranian relict	Greek-Iranian province endemic
Gazella postmitilini	Gazelle	80	9	Greek-Iranian relict	Convergent with African gazelles
Anancus arvernensis	Gomphothere elephant	35	4	Eurasian	Last European shovel-tusker
Homotherium davitashvili	Scimitar-toothed cat	7	1	Eurasian	Early Homotherium species
Stephanorhinus megarhinus	Woolly rhinoceros ancestor	53	16	Eurasian	Cold-adapted precursor
Puma pardoides	Eurasian puma	2	1	Greek-Iranian relict	Earliest puma in Eurasia
Chasmaportetes lunensis	Hunting hyena	1	1	Eurasian	Holarctic distribution
Propotamochoerus provincialis	Early suid (pig)	37	8	Eurasian	Wetland-adapted omnivore
Eucladoceros sp.	Bushy-antlered deer	6	3	Eurasian	Earliest cervid dispersal into Europe
Pseudalces sp.	Early elk/moose ancestor	6	2	Eurasian	Pre-Alces cervid
Nycterentes megamastoides	Raccoon dog	70	9	Eurasian	Opportunistic omnivore
Dinofelis abeli	Scimitar cat	1	1	Greek-Iranian relict	Last Eurasian representative
Oryx (Aegoryx) sp.	Beisa oryx-like antelope	1	1	Greek-Iranian relict	Desert-adapted survivor
TOTAL		808	138		

Key:

- NISP: Number of Identified Specimens
- MNI: Minimum Number of Individuals

== Implications for human evolution ==
Kvabebi's ecosystem — dated to 3.07 Ma — exhibited under 25% faunal similarity to contemporary African sites like Hadar, confirming no functional biological corridor existed with Africa at that time. Furthermore, Kvabebi's relict species (e.g., Kvabebihyrax, Protoryx) are entirely absent at Dmanisi, indicating this fauna vanished by around 2.8 Ma — 1.2 million years before hominins arrived in Georgia's Dmanisi region (around 1.8 Ma).

Thus, Kvabebi represents a dead-end refuge for Miocene survivors, not a "savanna bridge" for hominins. Early humans seem to have expanded not by tracking familiar habitats, but in response to Quaternary ice-age pulses that disrupted African environments.
