= Dmanisi skull 3 =

Hominin fossil

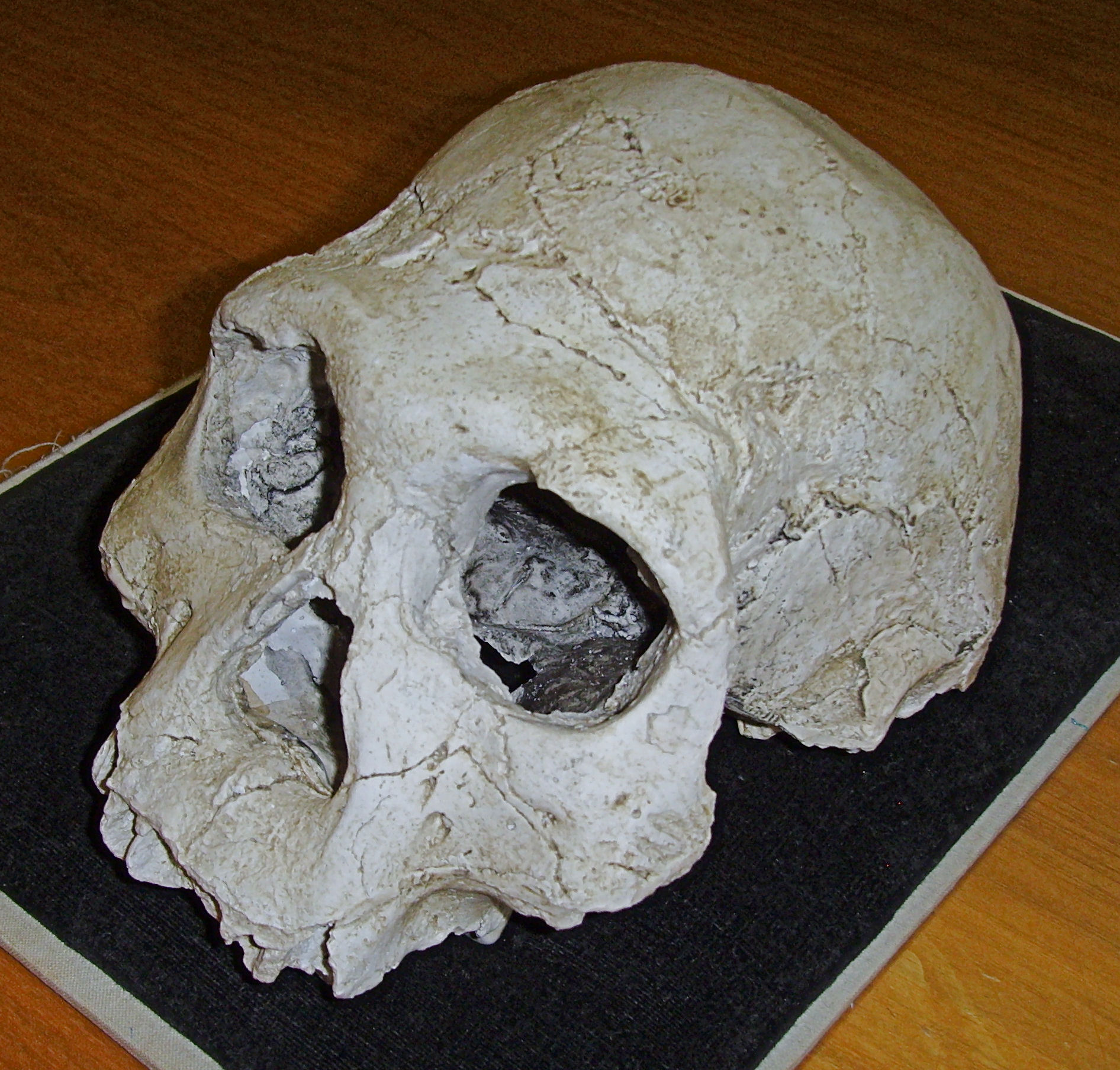
- Catalog no.: D2700
- Common name: Dmanisi skull 3
- Species: Homo erectus georgicus
- Age: c. 1.81±0.04 Mya
- Place discovered: Dmanisi in Georgia
- Date discovered: 2001
- Discovered by: Abesalom Vekua and David Lordkipanidze

D2700, also known as Dmanisi skull 3, is one of five skulls discovered in Dmanisi, Georgia in 2001 and classified as early Homo erectus. It is an almost complete skull and is in an exceptionally good condition. It was dated stratigraphically as about 1.8 million years old.

Since the publication of the Dmanisi skull 5 in 2013, all of the five Dmanisi skulls (Skull 3 included) have contributed to the ongoing debate on human taxonomy, with some experts proposing the re-categorization of Homo ergaster, and possibly even Homo habilis, as morphologically diverse subspecies of H. erectus.

== Discovery ==
D2700 and D2735 were found in 2001, just a decade after the first discovery of an early hominin mandible D211 at Dmanisi on September 24, 1991. In 1999, partial crania D2280 and D2282 were discovered. Cranium D2282 is likely the accompanying skull to mandible D211 and to be the remains of a young adult around 18–20 years old. Skull D2280 is inferred to have been an adult around 25–30 years old at the time of death. Moreover, in 2005, a new complete skull cranium was found: D4500. This cranium is inferred to be an adult skull and is more commonly known as "Skull 5." D4500's features are very rare compared to early Homo in that it had a small braincase yet an unusually large prognathic face. "Skull 5" has an accompanying mandible, D2600, which was found in 2000.

In 1999 two other skulls had been found at the same site—D2280 and D2282. D2280 was a near-complete brain-case with 780 cc brain-size. D2282 was a cranium and it included many of the facial and upper jaw bones. Its brain size was about 650 cc. In 1991 and 2000, two more lower jaws D211 and D2600 were discovered from the same site.

The five Dmanisi skulls are: D2280 (skull 1), D2282/D211 (skull 2), D2700/D2735 (skull 3), D3444/D3900 (skull 4) and D4500/D2600 (skull 5)

== Morphology ==
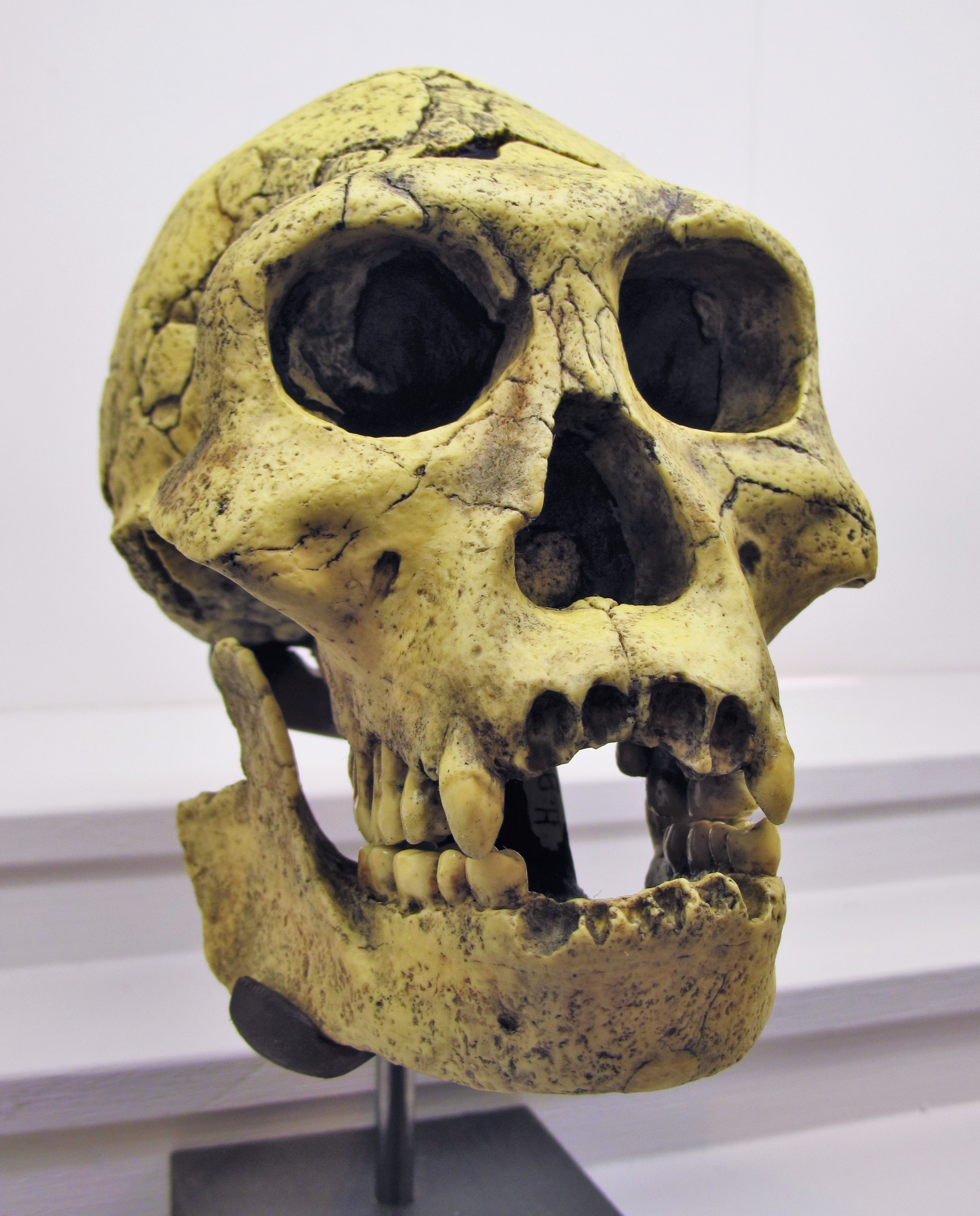
Modern reproduction of Dmanisi skull 3, Fossils skull D2700 and D2735 jaw, two of several found in Dmanisi in the Georgian Caucasus

The skull was found in an exceptionally good condition including a lower jaw (D2735) found about a meter away which is considered to be of the same person. D2700 is smaller than D2282. The fossil was dated stratigraphically, as from a site that was occupied between c. 1.85 and 1.77 million years ago. Its brain size is estimated at 600 cc.

There are many characteristics in which it resembles H. ergaster (or H. erectus) and also a number that resembles the ER1813.

Vekua et al. (2002) concluded:

In overall shape, D2700 is similar to D2280 and D2282, and D2735 resembles D211. Despite certain differences among these Dmanisi individuals, we do not see sufficient grounds for assigning them to more than one hominid [now, "hominin"] taxon. We view the new specimen as a member of the same population as the other fossils, and we here assign the new skull provisionally to Homo erectus.

All Dmanisi hominin remains were suggested to have been buried quickly after death. D2700 was found with four upper teeth, while D2735 contained eight teeth. As both fossil hominin remains are jointed, it is found that they ultimately fit one another. D2700's narrow nasal bones were found inferiorly broken from the orbital margins. Because the cranium's upper molars were partially erupted, D2700 is believed to have been the skull of a 13 to 15-year-old individual. It is considered that the skull was of a teenager.

There is some uncertainty as to the sex of the individual. The smaller size of the D2700 skull compared to skulls D2280 and D2282 suggests as well as its more slender feature suggest female sex, but the very large size of huge upper canines and large crowns have been argued to support classification as male.

== Classification ==
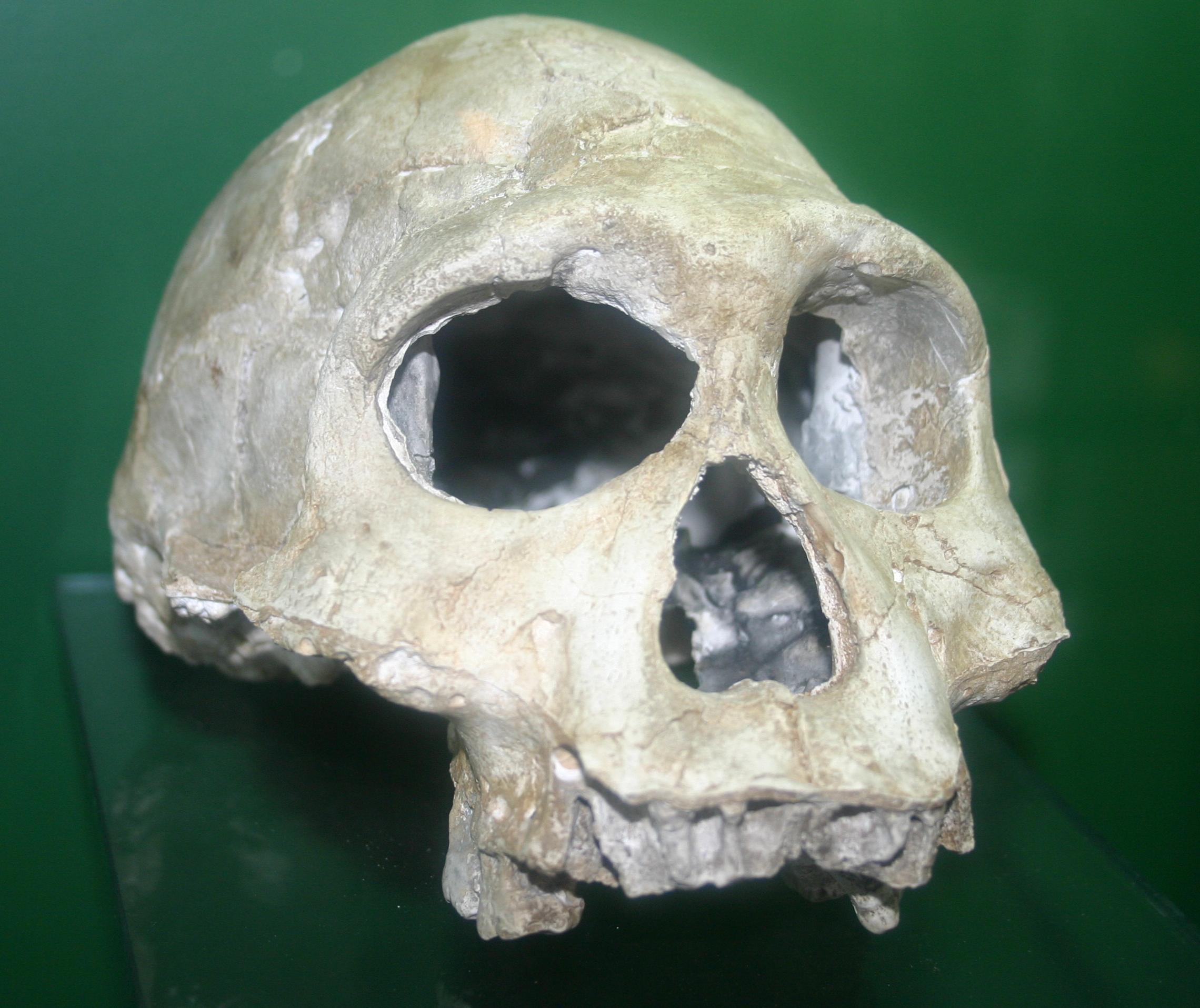
Detailed view of Dmanisi skull 3

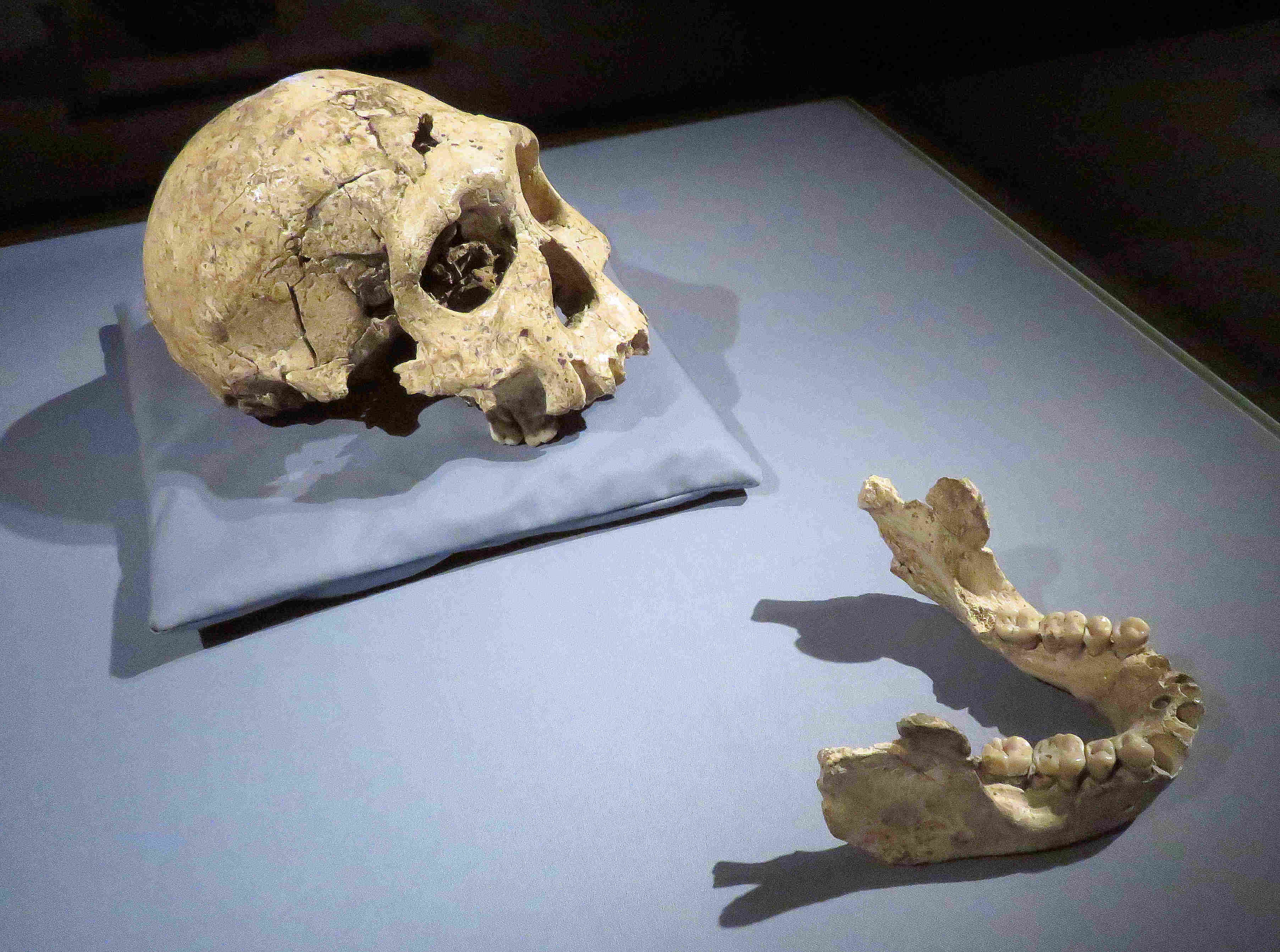
View of Dmanisi skull 3

It was conjectured that the categorical differences seen in for instance the mandibular and dental features of the crania from Dmanisi, may be ascribed to taxonomic diversity, as opposed to all five deriving from the same H. erectus lineage. The rather small braincase of D2700 was believed to be at odds with the characteristics of H. erectus. H. erectus georgicus was besides small in size compared to H. erectus. For these reasons, D2700, along with the other Dmanisi fossil remains, has been variously classified as a new subspecies, H. erectus georgicus, or as a new species in its own right, H. georgicus.

== See also ==
- List of human evolution fossils
