= Kvemo Orozmani =

Kvemo Orozmani ქვემო ოროზმანი
- Location in Georgia
- Coordinates: 41°18′23″N 44°12′03″E
- Country: Georgia
- Region: Kvemo Kartli
- Municipality: Dmanisi
- Elevation: 1,250 m (4,100 ft)

Population (2014)
  - Total: 361
- Time zone: UTC+4 (Georgian Time)

Kvemo Orozmani (Georgian: ქვემო ოროზმანი) is a village in Dmanisi Municipality of Kvemo Kartli region in Georgia. The village is located 4 km (2.5 mi) from Dmanisi and 34 km (21 mi) from Kazreti, 1,250 m (4,101 ft) above sea level. According to the 2014 census it had a population of 361.

Near the village, in the Dmanisi Municipality rich with significant archaeological discoveries, stone weapons and traces of early Palaeolithic settlements appear to back hypotheses about "another prehistoric object of international significance" in the area, a Georgian National Museum release said. Scientists have dated the findings back 1.77-1.84 million years and credited the unearthed material with having "completely changed [the previous] understanding of the Orozmani site".
