= Dmanisi historic site =

Dmanisi site
- დმანისის ნაქალაქარი (Georgian)
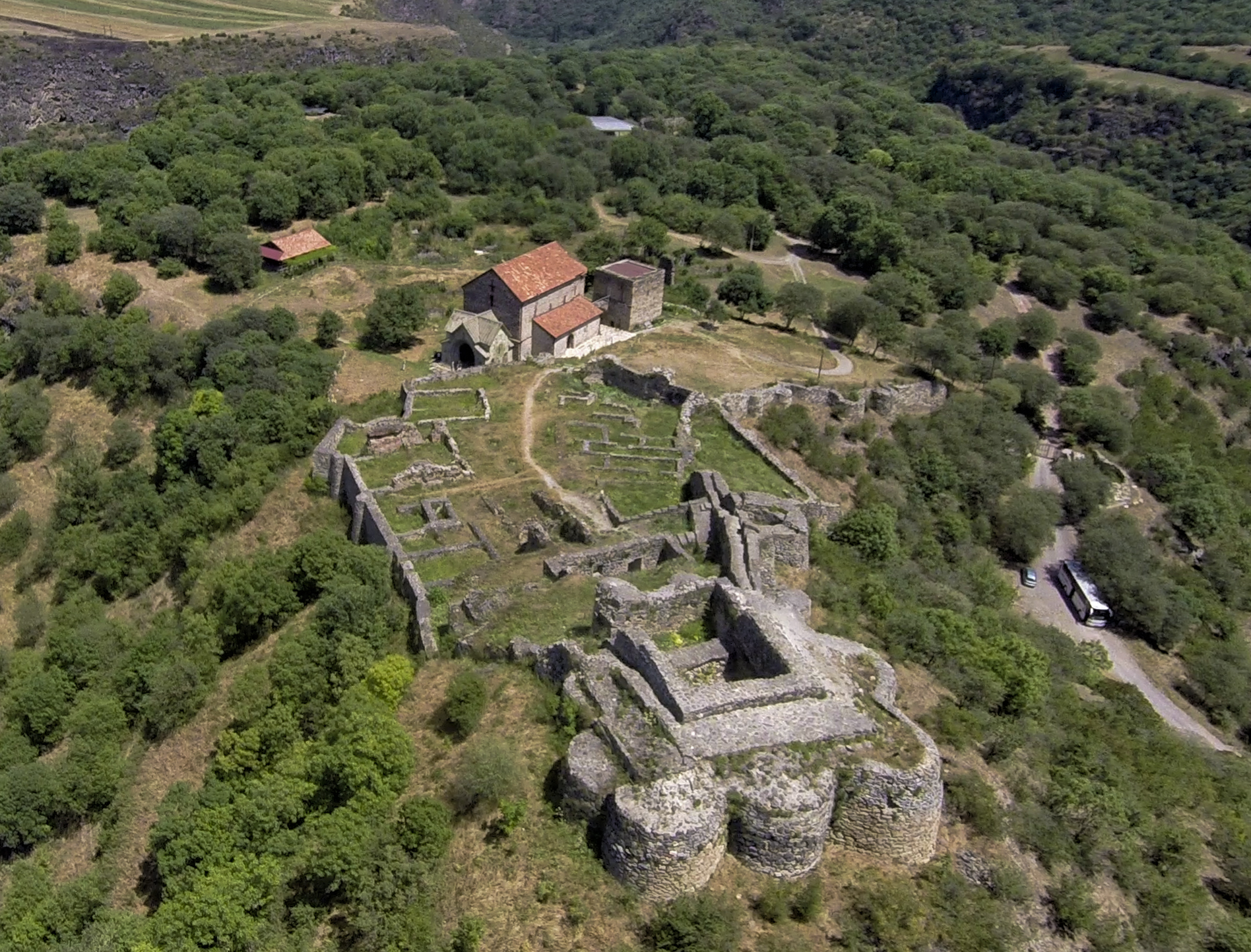
- Ruins of medieval Dmanisi.

- Location within Georgia
- 41.336424°N 44.342581°E
- Location: Dmanisi Municipality; Kvemo Kartli, Georgia

Immovable Cultural Monument of National Significance of Georgia
- Type: Historic, archaeological
- Designated: 2007

The Dmanisi historic site (Georgian: დმანისის ნაქალაქარი, romanized: dmanisis nakalakari, literally, "the ruined/former town of Dmanisi") is a historic and archaeological site in Georgia, located north of the village of Patara Dmanisi, Dmanisi Municipality, in south-central region of Kvemo Kartli, some 85 km (53 miles) southwest of Tbilisi, Georgia's capital.

Perched on a promontory at the confluence of the Mashavera and Pinezauri rivers, the site is an open-air museum, containing the early medieval Dmanisi Sioni cathedral and the ruins of one of the most important towns and commercial centres in medieval Georgia, with fortifications, churches, Muslim and Christian cemeteries, bathhouses, and workshops. In addition to its historic significance, Dmanisi is also known for the Dmanisi Paleolithic site, dating to around 1.8 million years ago, which contains some of the oldest evidence of humans outside of Africa.

== History ==
=== Early history and Muslim rule ===
The Dmanisi site was once settled by one of the largest and richest towns in medieval Georgia. The toponym "Dmanisi" is explained by the 18th-century Georgian scholar Prince Vakhushti of Kartli as being derived from the Old Georgian daba, "a hamlet".

Dmanisi emerged from a small settlement around an episcopal see, with the jurisdiction over the Dmaniskhevi (Mashavera) and Ktsia valleys and already known among the six dioceses of Kartli in the 6th century, to a major commercial town in the 9th–10th century, when the area was under the Arab rule. According to the medieval Georgian chronicles, the caliph's commander Bugha al-Kabir settled 100 Alan households from the Darialan at Dmanisi during his campaign in Kartli in 853. In 989, Dmanisi was conquered by the Armenian king David I of Lori, but the town then appears to have reverted to a Muslim control. The Georgian chronicles make mention of the certain Sitlarabi, apparently the corrupted name of Sayyid al-'Arab, a Muslim from Dmanisi who was installed by King Bagrat IV of Georgia as his vassal emir at Tiflis in 1068. An unnamed "emir of Dmanisi" is known to have supported the Seljuq commander Sau-tegin Sarhang al-Khass—"Sarang Alkhazi" of the Georgian sources—against King George II of Georgia in 1073.

=== Kingdom of Georgia ===
Sioni cathedral at Dmanisi.

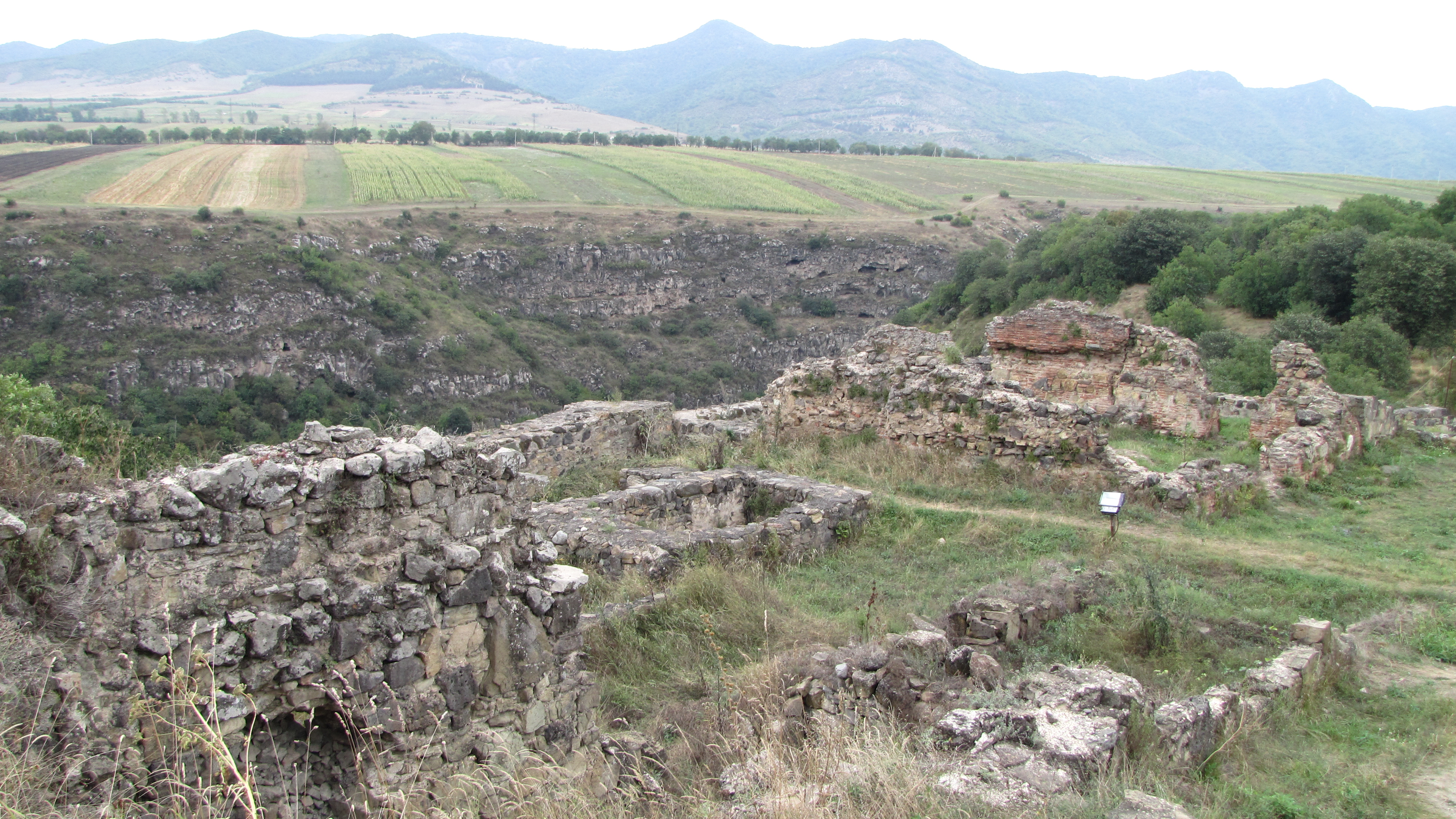
Ruins of the town walls.

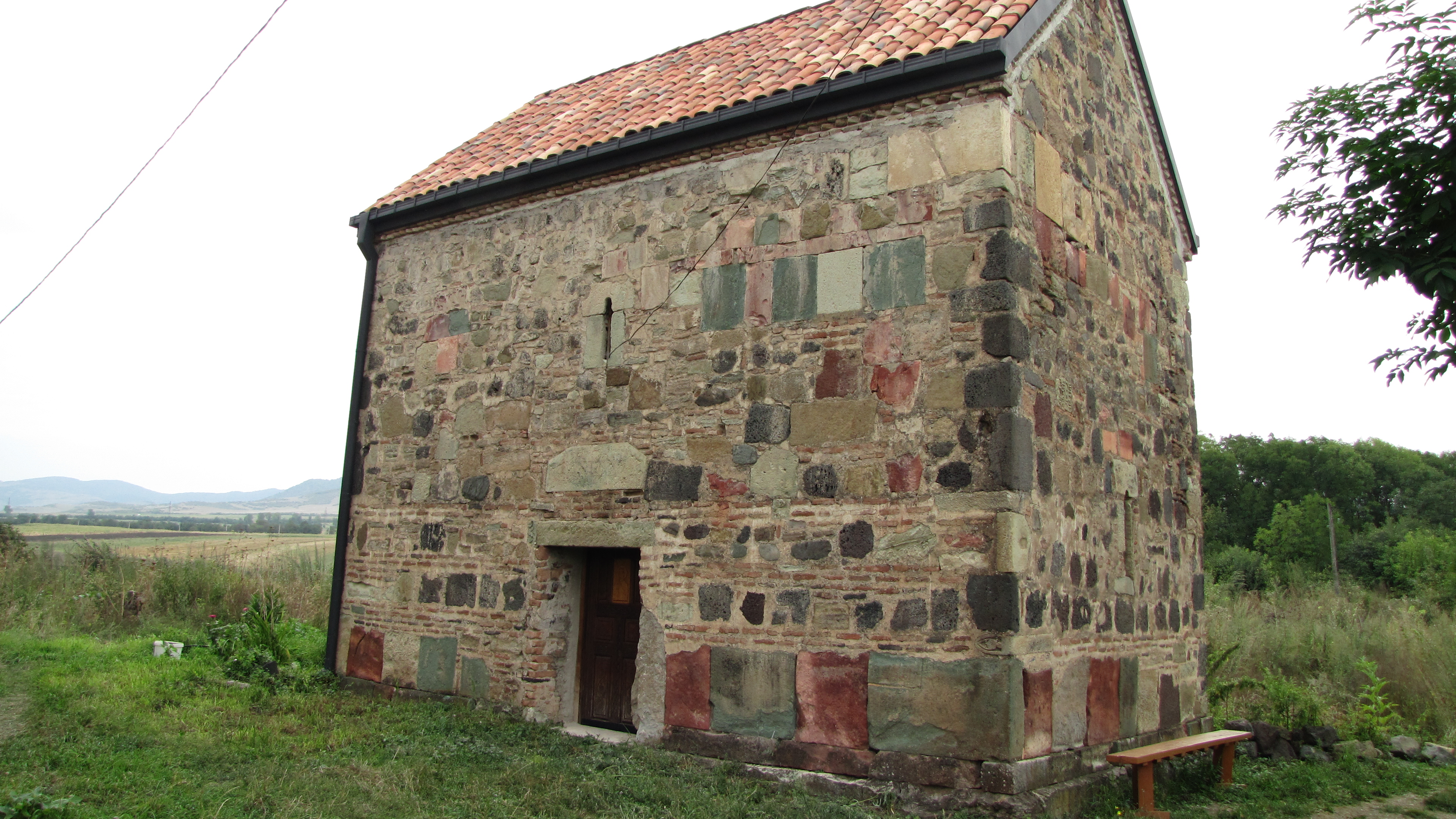
Church of St. Marina.

Threatened by the resurgent Georgian monarchy, the Muslim oligarchy of Dmanisi joined the appeal of Ganja and Tiflis to the Seljuq sultan Mahmud II against the encroachments from David IV of Georgia in 1121. David captured Dmanisi in March 1123, but his son Demetrius I had to reconquer the town in 1125. Under the Kingdom of Georgia, Dmanisi continued to prosper; crafts and trade flourished. According to Yaqut al-Hamawi, the town exported silk. Dmanisi's vibrant economic history is evidenced by more than 800 coins, mostly foreign, found in the area as well as the archaeological artifacts such as imported Iranian faïence and Chinese celadon and locally produced pottery, glassware, and jewelry.

The population of medieval Dmanisi was heterogeneous. Muslims constituted the single largest group in the town as indicated by a sizable cemetery, with the 13th–14th-century Arabic inscriptions, which numerically surpass the extant Christian—Georgian and Armenian—tombstones. Some Muslims left after the Georgian takeover: a sheikh named Sadr ad-Din Hamid b. Ali ad-Damanisi (died 1245) operated a madrasa in Damascus. The position of emir was now reduced to that of an appointed royal official: an early 13th-century stone inscription in Georgian from a small ruined chapel in Dmanisi mentions George IV's contemporary emir Job, son of Mikhrik, who had erected a cross-stone in the name of St. Demetrius.

When Georgia became a vassal to the Mongol Empire, Dmanisi was chosen for producing coinage: a copper type was minted in the name of David VI of Georgia in 1245. In the 1270s, Demetrius II of Georgia was constrained to make Dmanisi and the surrounding district over to his powerful minister Sadun, who had the confidence of the Mongols. King David VIII, being on good terms with the Mongol khan Baydu, was able to retrieve Dmanisi in 1293, but subsequently lost it to his rival brother, Vakhtang III, who was buried in the town on his death in 1308. Dmanisi then passed in possession of Vakhtang's elder son, Demetrius.

=== Downfall ===
Timur's invasions of Georgia between 1386 and 1403 brought Dmanisi's heyday to an end. In 1486, the town was devastated in an attack by Yaqub bin Uzun Hasan, the ruler of Aq Qoyunlu. After the final disintegration of the Kingdom of Georgia in the 1490s, it became part of the Kingdom of Kartli. Dmanisi was then granted by the crown to the Baratashvili family, whose two lines divided all of the town and its premises in 1536. Dmanisi was occupied and refortified by the Ottoman troops in 1578, but recovered by King Simon I of Kartli in 1583. Afterwards, Dmanisi was little more than a military outpost owned by the Baratashvili. A modest revival of economic and ecclesiastic life at Dmanisi, then also known as Dbanisi, in the early 18th century proved to be short-lived. Dmanisi's downfall in a renewed warfare and political anarchy was followed by the dissolution of its episcopal see in the middle of the 18th century; the area became largely depopulated until new rural settlements began to emerge around the former town already under the Imperial Russian rule over Georgia in the early 19th century. One of these, Bashkicheti, was renamed into Dmanisi after the historical town in 1947.

== Research ==
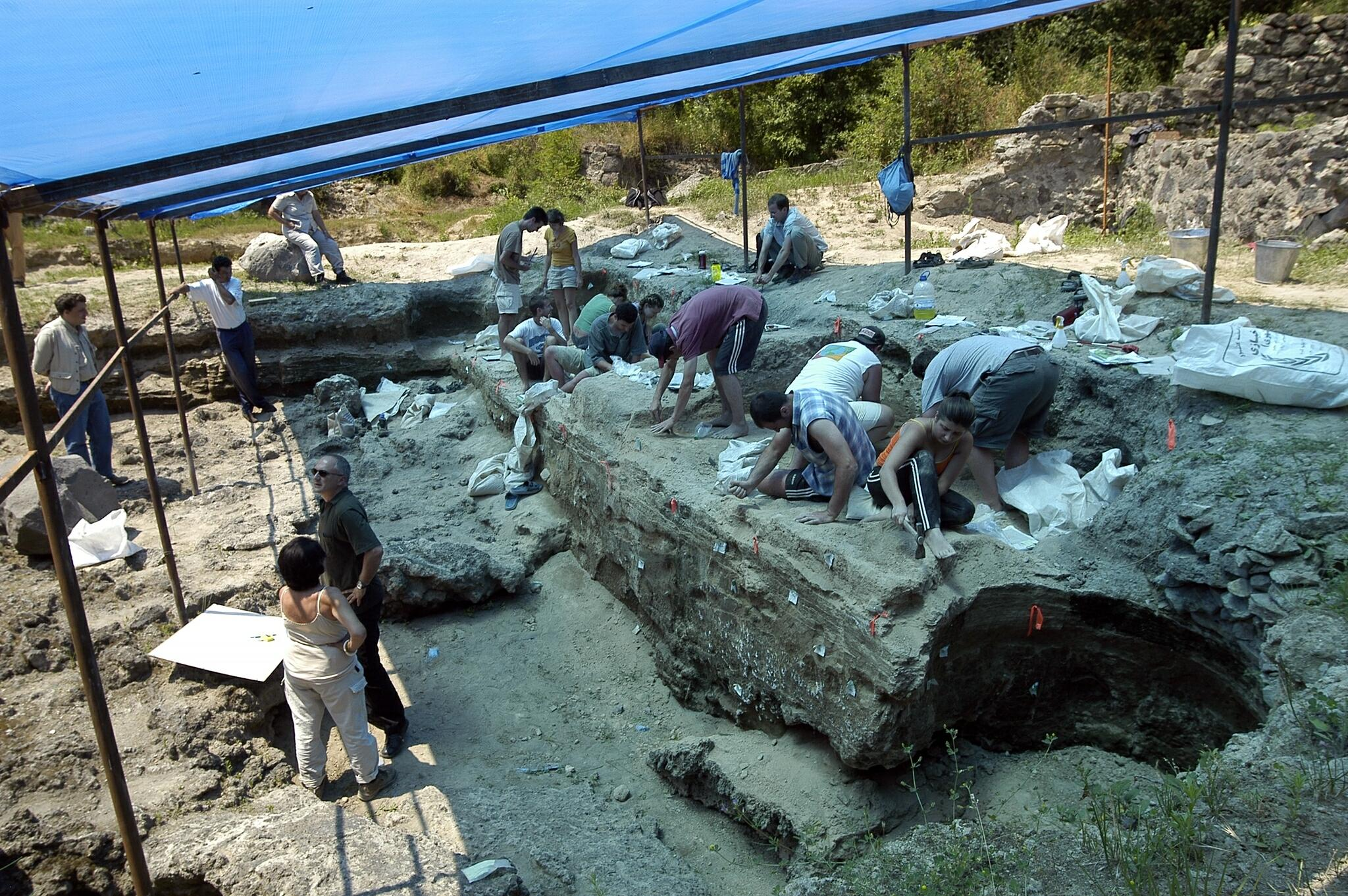
Archaeological digs in 2007.

In 1853, the ruins at Dmanisi were first visited and briefly described by Colonel Ivan Bartolomei and Prince Dimitri Orbeliani. Some of the Georgian inscriptions copied by these men were published by the French scholar Marie-Félicité Brosset in 1854. Ekvtime Taqaishvili oversaw some digs at the Dmanisi necropolis and republished Georgian inscriptions in 1894.

Archaeological exploration of the ruins began in 1936, but systematic excavations were not undertaken until the 1980s. In the process it became apparent that medieval pits or cellars had been dug into sand and ash deposits containing prehistoric animal bones and stone tools. In 1991 a human jaw and teeth showing anatomical similarities to Homo erectus were unearthed, followed by the landmark discovery of a series of skulls between 1991 and 2005. Dated to approximately 1.85 to 1.75 million years ago, these finds made Dmanisi one of the most ancient human habitation sites anywhere in Eurasia. In 2007, the Dmanisi Hominid Archaeological Site was added on the Tentative List of UNESCO World Heritage Centre.

In April 2021, a study based on the Hominin skeletons discovered at Dmanisi found that the skulls had a shape indicative of a brain arrangement more similar to that of apes, rather than one found in more modern Homo genus species. In particular, the study noted that the portion of the brain responsible for speech, the Broca's area, is significantly less developed in the Dmanisi fossils. The discovery could have a serious impact on scientific understanding of human development, as it implies H. Erectus left Africa before human brains took on their modern form, potentially changing the timeline of human evolution. A detailed history of anthropological research in Dmanisi is given in Dmanisi hominins.

== Site ==
A copper coin of King David VI of Georgia stuck at Dmanisi in 1245.

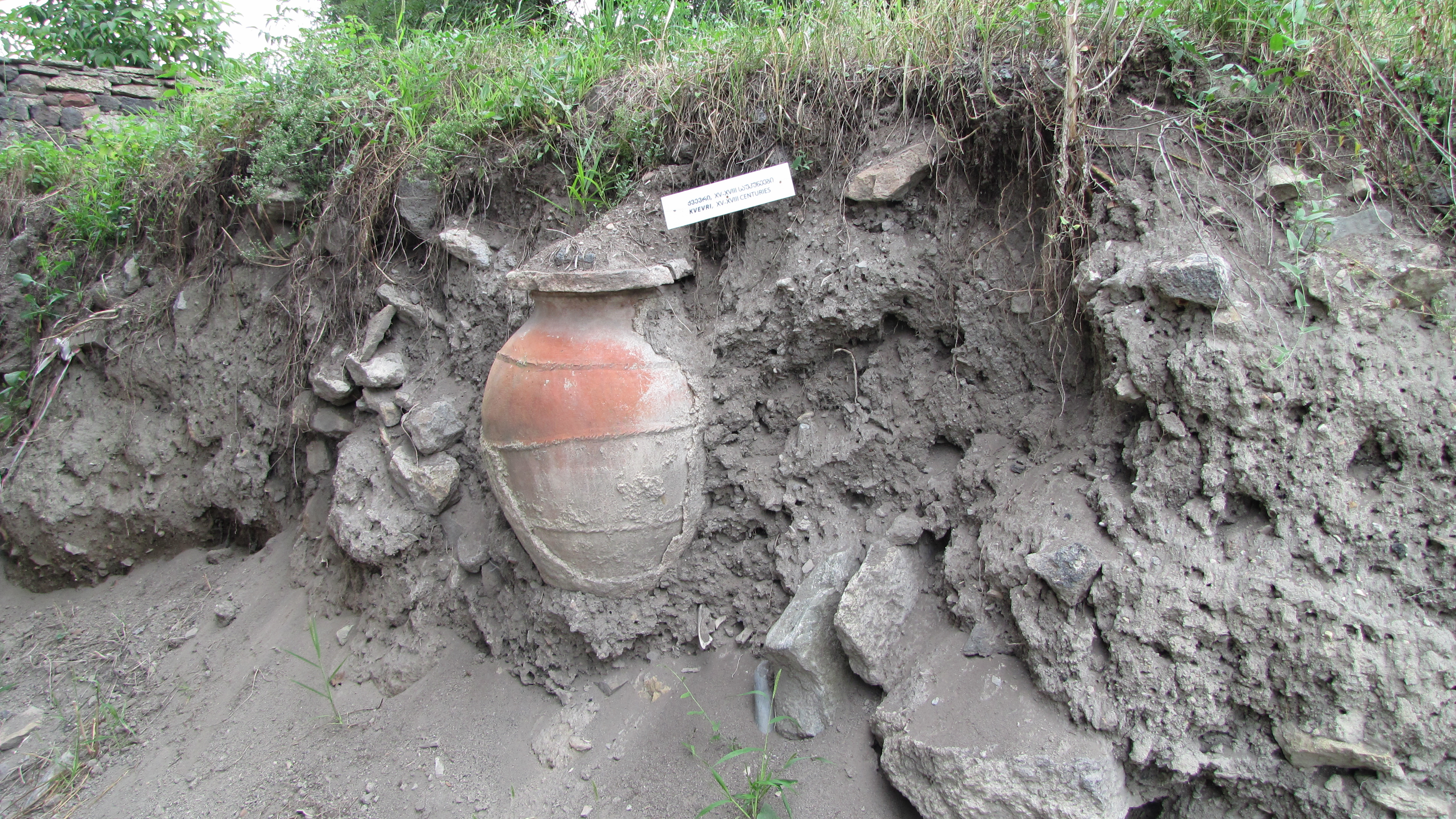
A wine jar, kvevri, buried sometime between the 15th and 18th centuries.

The Dmanisi historic site consists of two major parts comprising the remains of a settlement, its fortifications, churches, cemeteries, and other structures. One part is the proper town, occupying an area of 13 ha on a promontory at the confluence of the Mashavera and Pinezauri rivers, and the other one is an adjoining suburb, covering 12 ha along the Pinezauri river.

=== Proper town ===
The town was defended by a basalt wall, forming a great rampart and fortified with buttresses, on the east and by the Mashavera valley on the north and northwest, going to the depth of 90 metres here. The southern part of the promontory was occupied by a citadel, of about 3,250 square metres. It was located inside the town wall, separated from the town by a special rampart which contains the only gate. The citadel contained a palace, bathhouse, and other structures. To the west, a 200 m-long clandestine tunnel, largely preserved to this day, led to the Mashavera river.

A road from the south entered the town through a gate. Its continuation and streets within the town were about 2,5 metre-wide, paved with large stone slabs, and edged by a low stone wall. Houses in Dmanisi were built of irregular lines of basal stones, with brick fireplaces and niches, inner walls plastered and, in case of richer houses, covered with green ceramic tiles. In the ruined town's centre, just below the citadel, stands Dmanisi's cathedral church of Sioni, an early medieval basilica with a three-bay nave and apse, and a richly adorned narthex added in the early 13th century. North of it, there is a small single-nave church of St. Marina, rebuilt in 1702, as revealed by a Georgian inscription above its southern portal. Farther to the northeast, there are ruins of two other small churches, which contain stones with Armenian inscriptions.

=== Suburb ===
The suburb was located south of the proper town. It contained an extensive 12th–14th-century cemetery, nearly as large as the town itself, consisting of Christian—Georgian and Armenian—and larger, Muslim sections. Ruins of a small single-nave church survive in the Christian cemetery. Along the right bank of the Pinezauri, there are ruins of three bathhouses.

=== Museum ===
The Dmanisi site is an open-air museum, administered as part of the Georgian National Museum as the Dmanisi Historic and Architectural Museum-Reserve. The museum also contains an exhibition hall, displaying more than 2300 artifacts. The Dmanisi museum operates seasonally, from May to October. The Dmanisi Sioni cathedral and other structures in the site were inscribed on the list of the Immovable Cultural Monuments of National Significance in 2007.
