= Dmanisi Sioni cathedral =

Medieval basilica in Georgia

Dmanisi Sioni
- დმანისის სიონი
- Dmanisi Sioni cathedral.
- Interactive map of Dmanisi Sioni
- Location: Dmanisi historic site Dmanisi Municipality, Kvemo Kartli, Georgia
- Coordinates: 41.336424°N 44.342581°E
- Type: Three-church basilica / hall church

The Dmanisi cathedral of the Theotokos (Georgian: დმანისის ღვთისმშობლის სახელობის საკათედრო ტაძარი, romanized: dmanisis ghvtismshoblis sakhelobis sak'atedro t'adzari), commonly known as the Dmanisi Sioni church (დმანისის სიონი, dmanisis sioni) is an early medieval basilica located in the heart of the Dmanisi historic site, a ruined medieval town in Georgia's southern Kvemo Kartli region, perched on a promontory at the confluence of the Mashavera and Pinezauri rivers. The church has a three-bay nave, a prominently protruding apse, and a richly adorned narthex added in the early 13th century. The Sioni church is a functioning Georgian Orthodox church, renovated in 2009, and protected by the state as an Immovable Cultural Monument of National Significance.

== History ==
Following a medieval Georgian tradition of naming churches after particular places in the Holy Land, the Dmanisi cathedral bears the name of Mount Zion at Jerusalem. The church is dated to the 6th–7th century by the scholars such Giorgi Chubinashvili, Levan Muskhelishvili, and Vakhtang Beridze, but the traditional dating has recently been revised by the specialists such as E. Arjevanidze to the 9th century. It served as the seat of homonymous episcopal see until the diocese had to be dissolved c. 1750. The see was reinstated in August 2003. According to the medieval Georgian chronicles, Dmanisi served as a burial ground to King Vakhtang III of Georgia, who died in 1308; the tomb has not survived. Later, both the church and its yard were used as a necropolis by the noble family of Baratashvili and their offshoot, the Orbeliani, from the 16th century into the 18th.

== Architecture ==
Dmanisi Sioni. A prominently protruding apse on the east.

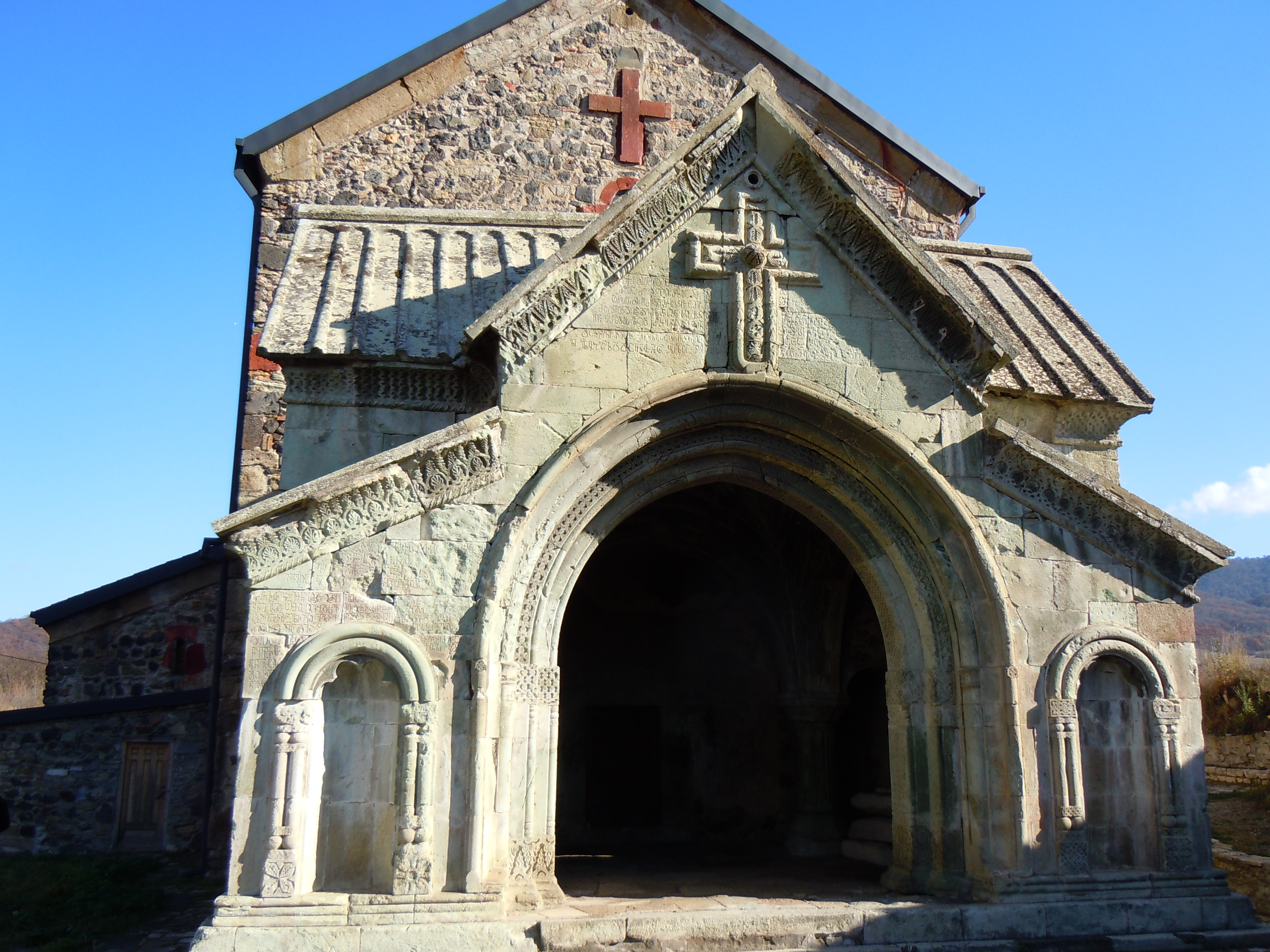
Dmanisi Sioni. The narthex with Georgian inscriptions above the entrance.

The church has been described, following the definition by Chubinashvili, as a "three-church" basilica, that is, a peculiar Georgian design in which the nave is completely separated from the aisles with solid walls, in order to create what are almost three independent churches. Arjevanidze identifies the building as a hall church with a mono-pitched roof.

The church, without later additions and narthex, measures 23 × 11.5 m. It is built of lines of small grayish stones, sometimes regularly hewn blocks, and is roofed with flat stone tiles. As the building has been reconstructed in the course of history, only the middle nave retains its original architectural form. It terminates in a protruding semicircular apse on the east and exaggerated engaged pilasters in the interior of the building create arched bays in between. The inner walls were once fully frescoed; the badly damaged 13th–14th-century depictions of the Mandylion, saints and inscriptions survive in the altar apse; fragments of a royal portrait and two scenes of the Doomsday are visible in the northeastern and northwestern pilasters, respectively. A small flagstone in the south wall of the altar bears a carving in relief, depicting two laymen standing en face, with a pedestalled cross in between them. Two side annexes, on the south and north, respectively, are 9th–10th-century structures, containing a sacristy and prothesis, both with apses.

Sometime between 1213 and 1222, in the reign of George IV of Georgia, a narthex was added on the western end of the basilica. The narthex is richly adorned with ornamental stone-carvings in relief and covered with a vault, supported by four pillars and arches; its all three facades, columns, and arches are faced with light green smoothly hewn stone slabs. To the north of the church stands a rectangular bell-tower, remodeled several times. Farther, to the northeast, there is small single-nave church of Saint Marina, rebuilt in 1702 by Isakhar, a caregiver for Princess Mariam of Kartli.

The narthex bears three inscriptions in the medieval Georgian asomtavruli script. One, on the western facade, makes mention of King George IV and Bishop Theodosius, a ktetor. Another, also on the western facade, mentions George IV's son David VII and relates that the bishop of Dmanisi abolished a local law that required a payment for the wedding rite. The third inscription, in the inner southeastern column, commemorates the certain Apridon, who had donated 30 drahms to the construction.
