= Dmanisi skull 5 =

Hominin fossil

Coordinates: 41°19′51″N 44°12′11″E

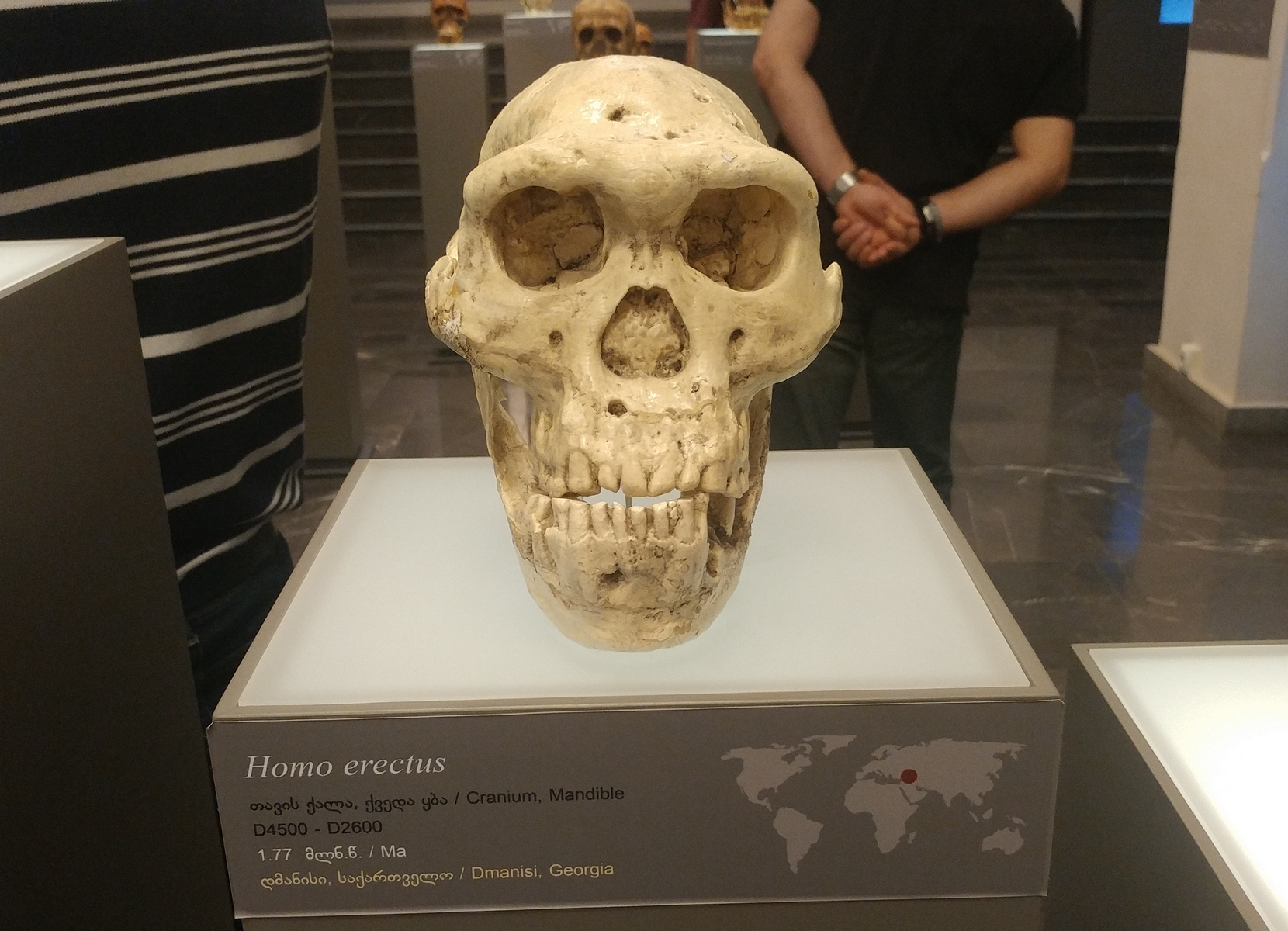
- Skull 5 in National Museum
- Catalog no.: D4500
- Common name: Dmanisi skull 5
- Species: Homo erectus
- Age: 1.8 million years
- Place discovered: Dmanisi in Georgia
- Date discovered: 2005
- Discovered by: David Lordkipanidze

The Dmanisi skull, also known as Skull 5 or D4500, is one of five skulls discovered in Dmanisi, Georgia and classified as early Homo erectus. Described in a publication in October 2013, it is estimated to be about 1.8 million years old and is the most complete skull of a Pleistocene Homo species, and the first complete adult hominin skull of that degree of antiquity. According to researchers, the discovery "provides the first evidence that early Homo comprised adult individuals with small brains but body mass, stature and limb proportions reaching the lower range limit of modern variation." The skull has been the cause of a paleontological controversy that is still ongoing as of 2017: many hominin fossils thought to be from different species such as Homo rudolfensis or Homo habilis may not have been separate species at all. Rather, they may have been a single evolving lineage.

== Discovery of the skull ==
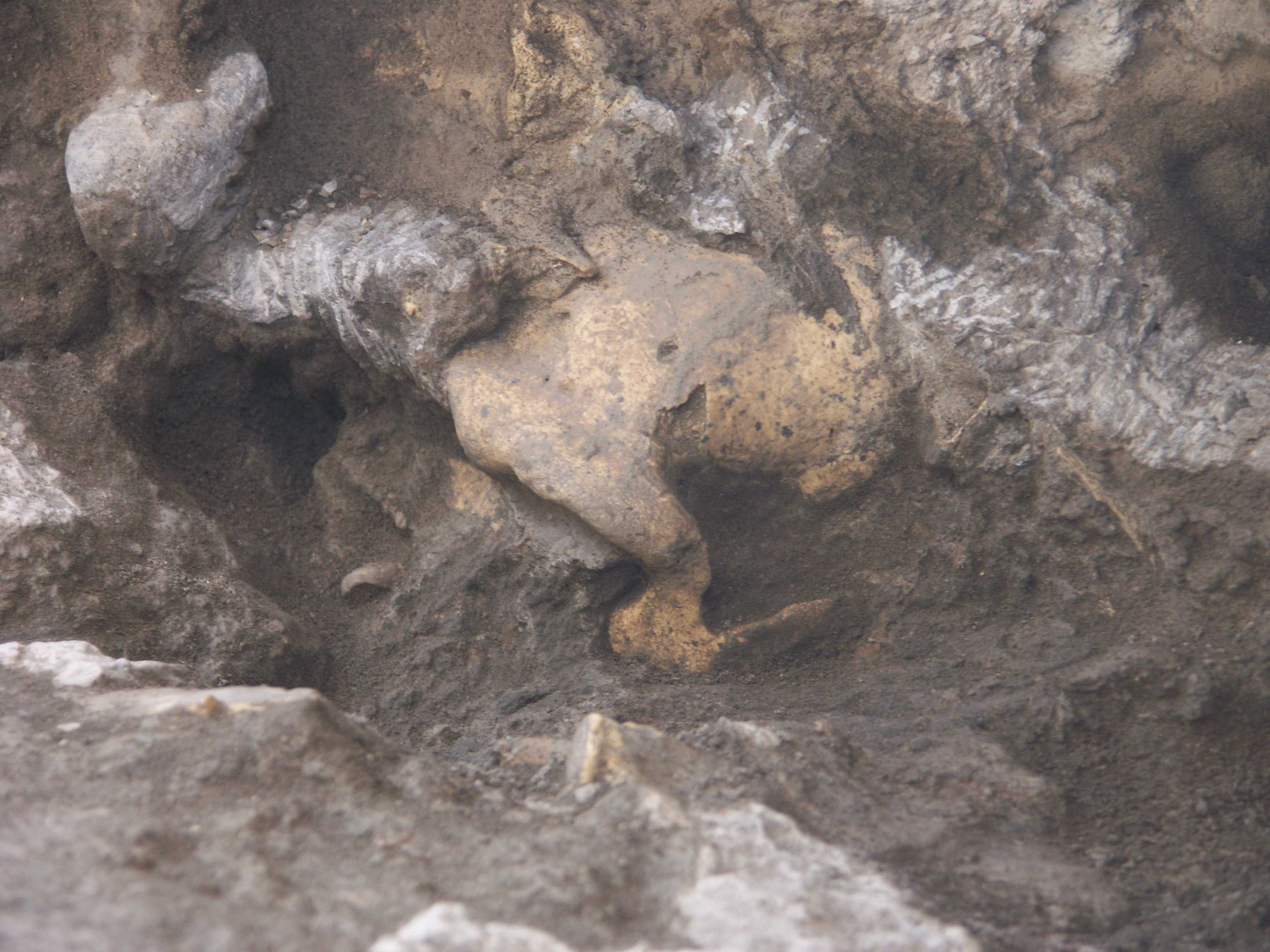
Excavation.

In 1991, Georgian scientist David Lordkipanidze found traces of early human occupation in the cave at Dmanisi in Georgia: a hamlet and an archaeological site about 90 kilometres (56 mi) southwest of the country's capital, Tbilisi. Since then, five early hominin skulls have been discovered at the site. Skull 5, found in 2005, is the most complete specimen of them all. After further analysis, it was coupled with its mandible (D2600) found 5 years earlier. The final analysis of the discovery took many years and was only published in 2013.

== Description of the skull ==
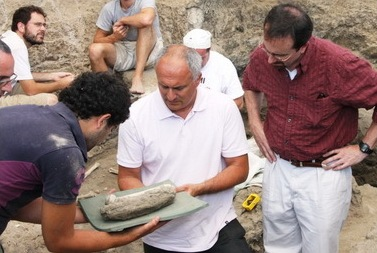
David Lordkipanidze (centre) on the archeological site at Dmanisi, 2010

Despite a brain volume the size of a large Australopithecus male, (546 cubic centimetres (33.3 in^{3})) all the characteristics of Homo erectus are clearly visible on Skull 5. The braincase sizes of the other Dmanisi skulls are between 601 cubic centimetres (36.7 in^{3}) and 730 cubic centimetres (45 in^{3}).

The cranial superstructures of Skull 5, which are prominent and massive, suggest that it was probably a male. Its face is one of the largest of any human ancestor discovered to date. The zygomatic arches are massive with the right one displaying many traces of deformations, probably due to fractures and injuries. Researchers estimate that the height of the individual was between 146 centimetres (4.79 ft) and 166 centimetres (5.45 ft) and his weight between 47 kilograms (104 lb) and 50 kilograms (110 lb).

== Dating ==
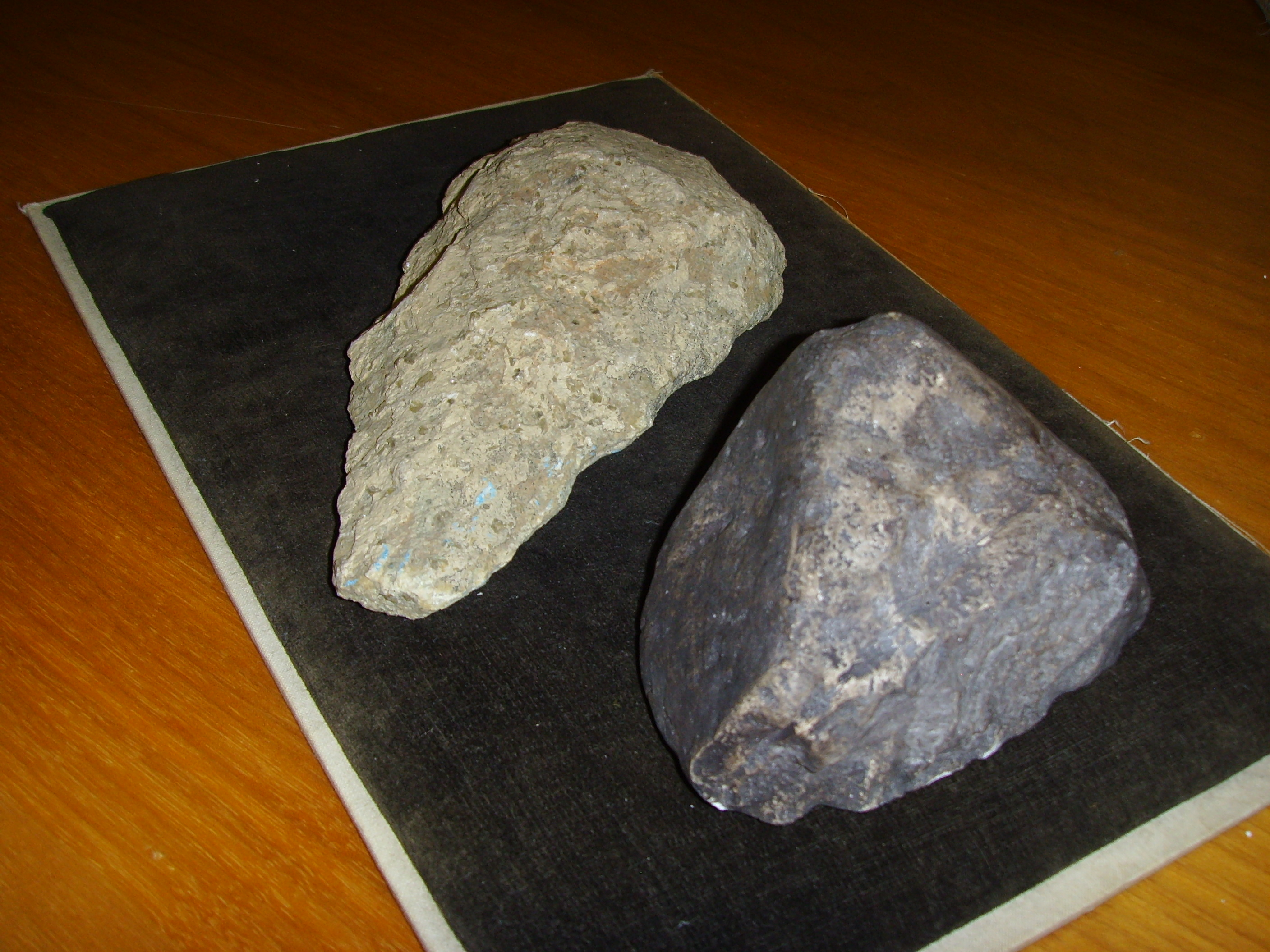
Stone tools found on the Dmanisi paleontological site

Until the 1980s, scientists assumed that hominins had been restricted to the African continent for the whole of the Early Pleistocene (until about 0.8 Ma), only migrating out during a phase named Out of Africa I. Thus, the vast majority of archaeological effort was disproportionately focused on Africa. The Dmanisi archeological site is the earliest hominin site out of Africa and the analysis of its artifacts showed that some hominins, chiefly the Homo erectus georgicus had left Africa as far back as 1.85 million years ago. All of the 5 skulls are roughly the same age.

Consequently, the paleontological significance of the dating of the Dmanisi skulls is major. It is worth noting that it was not associated with the discovery of skull 5, but with another specimen found at the same site, the Dmanisi Skull 3, also known as D2700.

== Controversy and significance of the discovery ==
The Dmanisi skulls, especially Skull 5 with its comparatively tiny 546 cubic centimetres (33.3 in^{3}) brain compared to other skulls found at the site, suggests that the earliest species of the genus Homo were actually subspecies of the species erectus. The variation in morphology of all the Dmanisi skulls is so large that had they been discovered on different archaeological sites, they most likely would have been classified as different species. However, all Dmanisi skulls have the same age and have been found at exactly the same place.

Faced with the wide variation between Skull 5 and the other Dmanisi skulls, Georgian and University of Zurich researchers were prompted to examine normal variations in modern human skulls and chimpanzees skulls. They found that while they looked different from one another, the great variations among all Dmanisi skulls were no greater than those seen among modern people and among chimpanzees. Consequently, it was entirely possible that such a discrepancy could be found in Homo erectus.

This discovery led the scientists to suggest that two species of early hominins, Homo rudolfensis and Homo habilis, were actually both Homo erectus. This is an ongoing debate among the scientific community.

== List of Dmanisi 5 specimens ==
The five Dmanisi skulls are named:

- D2280 (skull 1)
- D2282/D211 (skull 2)
- D2700/D2735 (skull 3)
- D3444/D3900 (skull 4)
- D4500/D2600 (skull 5)

== See also ==
- Homo erectus
- List of human evolution fossils
  - List of human fossils
