= Capture of Dmanisi =

- Part of the Georgian–Seljuk wars
Date	1123
Location	Dmanisi, Kingdom of Georgia 41°19′54″N 44°12′13″E
Result	Georgian victory

Belligerents
Kingdom of Georgia	Seljuk Empire

Commanders and leaders
David IV	Unknown Seljuk governor

Strength
Unknown	Unknown

Casualties and losses
Unknown	Unknown

The Capture of Dmanisi occurred in 1123 during the Georgian–Seljuk wars, when forces of the Kingdom of Georgia under King David IV captured the fortified city of Dmanisi from a Seljuk garrison. The event formed part of a wider Georgian campaign to remove Seljuk influence from eastern and southern Georgia following the Georgian victories at the Battle of Didgori in 1121 and the recapture of Tbilisi in 1122.

The capture strengthened Georgian control over strategic trade routes in southern Kartli and consolidated the territorial expansion of the Georgian kingdom during the reign of David IV.

== Background ==
During the late 11th century, large parts of the southern Caucasus fell under the influence of the Seljuk Empire. Following Seljuk victories over regional powers and the weakening of Byzantine influence in the area, several Georgian cities—including Dmanisi—came under Muslim control and were governed by Seljuk emirs or garrisons.

After ascending the Georgian throne in 1089, David IV of Georgia initiated extensive military and administrative reforms. These reforms strengthened royal authority, reorganized the Georgian army, and incorporated auxiliary forces such as the Kipchaks. By the early 12th century, these changes enabled Georgia to challenge Seljuk dominance in the region.

The decisive Georgian victory at the Battle of Didgori in 1121 severely weakened Seljuk influence in eastern Georgia. In 1122, David IV captured Tbilisi and made it the capital of the kingdom. The following year, Georgian forces moved to capture remaining Seljuk strongholds, including Dmanisi.

== Capture ==
In 1123, Georgian forces advanced against the fortified city of Dmanisi, which remained under Seljuk control. The city was strategically important because it controlled trade routes connecting the Caucasus with Armenia and the Near East.

Georgian troops besieged the city and defeated the Seljuk defenders after a period of fighting. The city was subsequently incorporated into the Kingdom of Georgia and its defenses were restored under Georgian authority.

== Aftermath ==
The capture of Dmanisi was part of the broader Georgian reconquest of territories previously dominated by the Seljuks. Following the campaign, the region was integrated into the Georgian administrative system.

Under Georgian rule, Dmanisi continued to function as an important regional center and trading hub during the 12th and 13th centuries, a period often described as the Golden Age of Georgia.

== See also ==
- Georgian–Seljuk wars
- David IV of Georgia
- Battle of Didgori
- Siege of Tbilisi (1122)

== Literature ==
- Rayfield, Donald (2012). Edge of Empires: A History of Georgia. Reaktion Books.
- Suny, Ronald Grigor (1994). The Making of the Georgian Nation. Indiana University Press.
- The Georgian Chronicles
