= Dmanisi Municipality =

Coordinates: 41.3167°N 44.3500°E

Dmanisi Municipality დმანისის მუნიციპალიტეტი
- Dmanisi historic site

- Flag Seal

- Interactive map of Dmanisi Municipality
- Country: Georgia
- Mkhare: Kvemo Kartli
- Administrative centre: Dmanisi

Government
  - Type: Mayor–Council
  - Body: Dmanisi Municipal Assembly
  - Mayor: Koba Muradashvili (GD)

Area
  - Total: 1,198.8 km^{2} (462.9 sq mi)

Population (2021)
  - Total: 20,922
  - Density: 17.452/km^{2} (45.202/sq mi)

Population by ethnicity
  - Azerbaijanis: 65,5 %
  - Georgians: 33,1 %
  - Armenians: 0,5 %
  - Greeks: 0,5 %
  - Russians: 0,4 %
- Time zone: UTC+4 (Georgian Time)
- Website: dmanisi.gov.ge

Dmanisi (Georgian: დმანისის მუნიციპალიტეტი, Dmanisis munitsip’alit’et’i) is a municipality in Georgia's southern region of Kvemo Kartli, covering an area of 1,198.8 km^{2} (463 sq mi). As of 2021 it had a population of 20,922 people. The city of Dmanisi is its administrative centre.

== Geography ==
The municipality of Dmanisi is bordered to the north by Tsalka Municipality, to the northeast by Tetritsqaro Municipality, the east by Ninotsminda Municipality, and to the west by Bolnisi Municipality. The south is also located along the Armenia–Georgia border.

Most of the municipality is occupied by low mountain ranges, which are forested in the eastern part and reach heights of 1,500–1,900 m at the ridges. In the sparsely populated western part, the Javakheti Range rises to about 3,000 m; the highest peaks on the range's border with the Meskhetia-Javakheti region are Emlikli (3,054 m) and Aghrikari (2,972 m).

== Administrative divisions ==
Dmanisi municipality is administratively divided into 15 communities (თემი, temi) with 57 villages (სოფელი, sopeli) and one city (Dmanisi).

== Population ==
The population of Dmanisi Municipality is 20,922 according to the 2021 estimate, which is a slight increase from the last census of 2014 (19,141). The ethnic composition is 31.2% Georgian, 65.5% Azerbaijani. The population density is 17.5 people per square kilometer.

Population Dmanisi Municipality
	1923	1939	1959	1970	1979	1989	2002	2014	2021
Dmanisi Municipality (Note: Until 1947 district and city were called Bashkicheti.)	-	33,975	▲34,174	▲43,785	▲44,075	▲52,208	▼28,034	▼19,141	▲20,922
Dmanisi	670	▲1,871	▲4,778	▼4,076	▲4,530	▲8,650	▼3,427	▼2,661	▲2,920
Data: Population statistics Georgia 1897 to present. Note: (Note: The 2014 census found an inexplicable gap with the data from the national statistical office Geostat. UN-assisted research has found the 2002 census was inflated by about 8-9 percent. See, "1. Introduction", Page 1.)

== Politics ==
Dmanisi Municipal Assembly (Georgian: დმანისის საკრებულო, Dmanisi Sakrebulo) is the representative body in Dmanisi Municipality, consisting of 30 members which are elected every four years. The last election was held in October 2021. Koba Muradashvili of Georgian Dream was elected mayor.

Party	2017	2021	Current Municipal Assembly
Georgian Dream	27	15	
United National Movement	1	12	
Progress and Freedom		1	
Independent		2 (Note: Ramiz Ramazanovi - split from UNM.)	
Development Movement	3		
Total	31	30	

== Transport ==
The S6 highway passes through the municipality, connecting the capital Tbilisi to Marneuli. The municipality does not have its own railway line or a line connected through it.

== Gallery ==
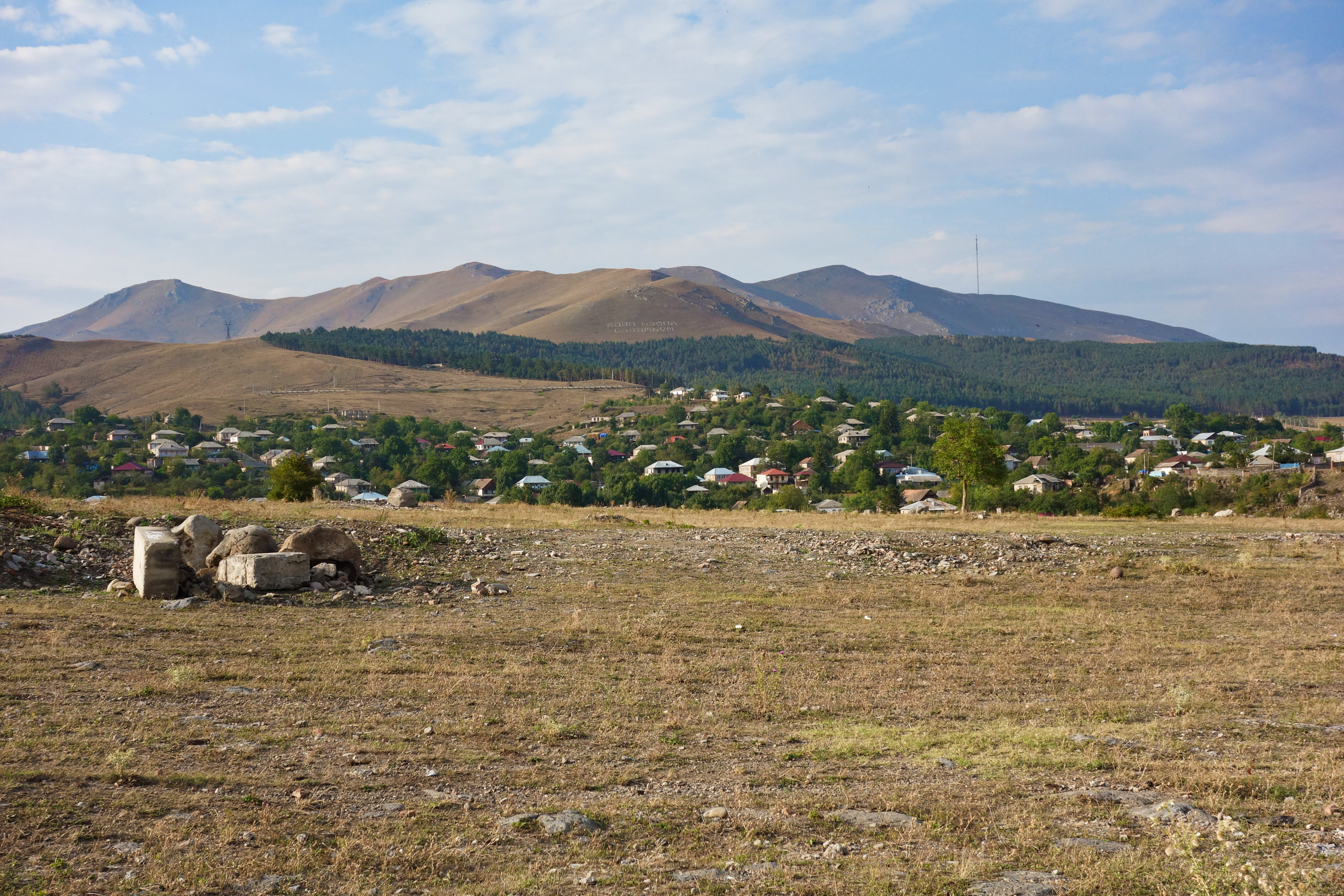
View of Dmanisi from the south

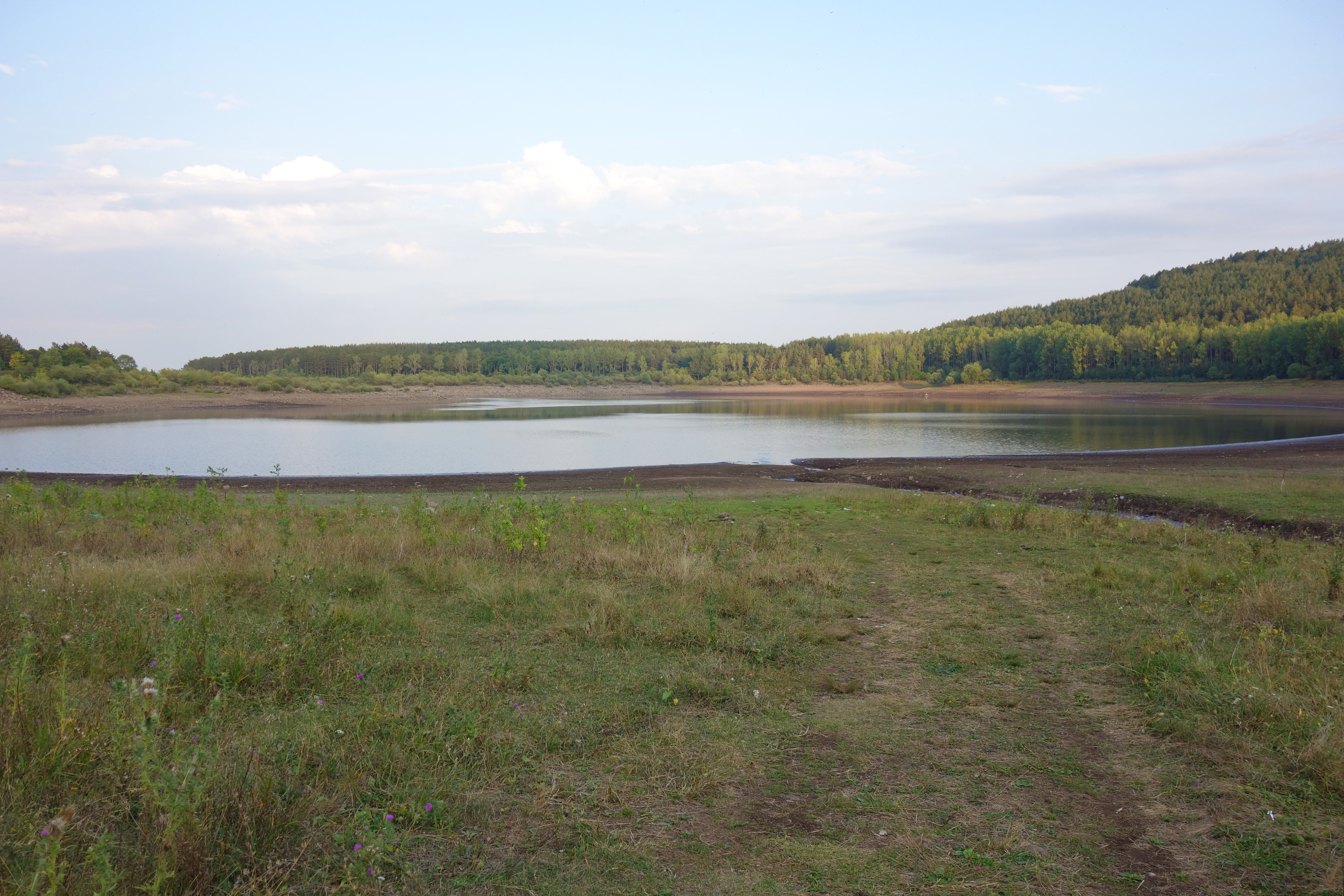
Pantiani Reservoir

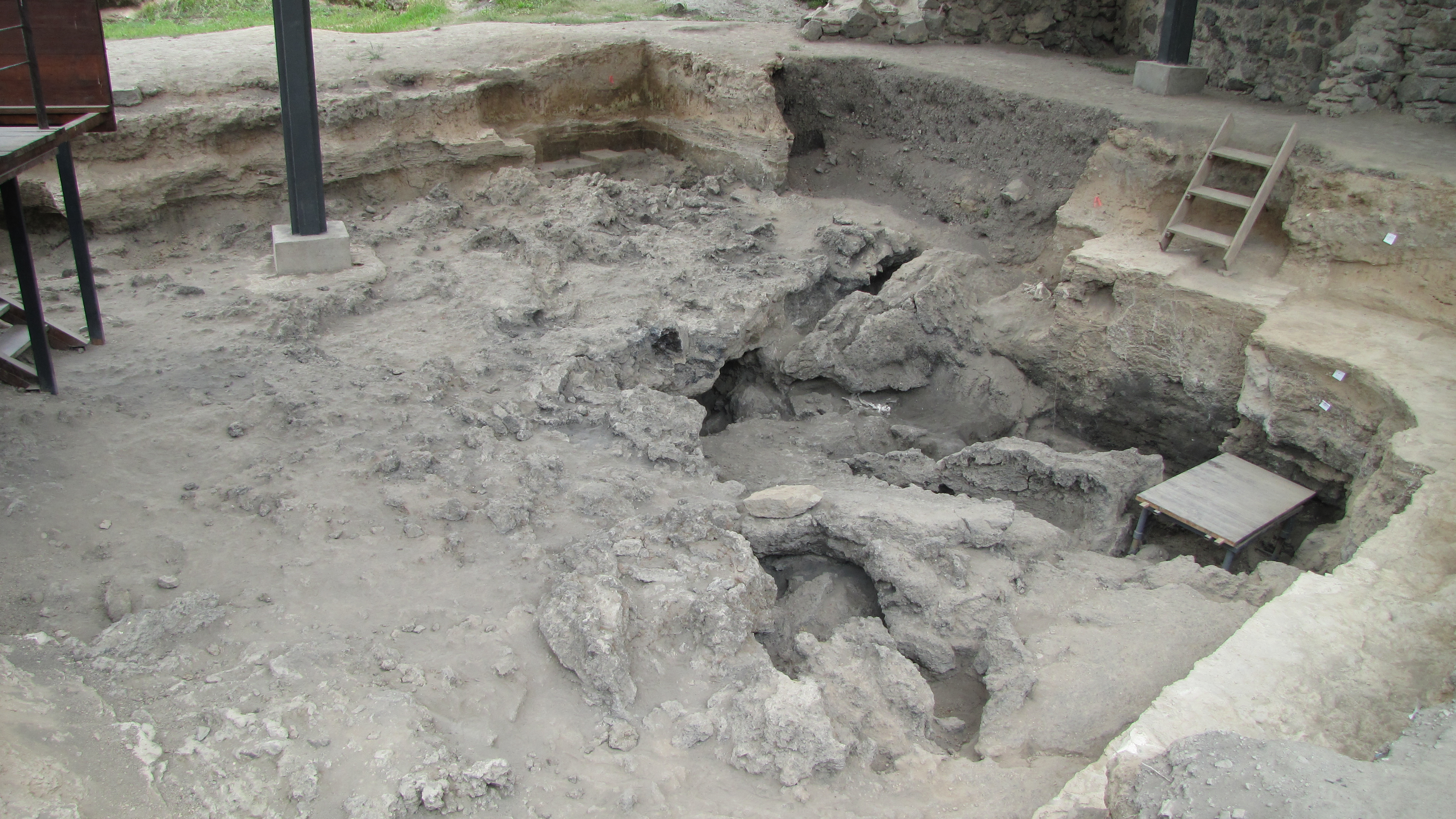
Archaeological site of Dmanisi

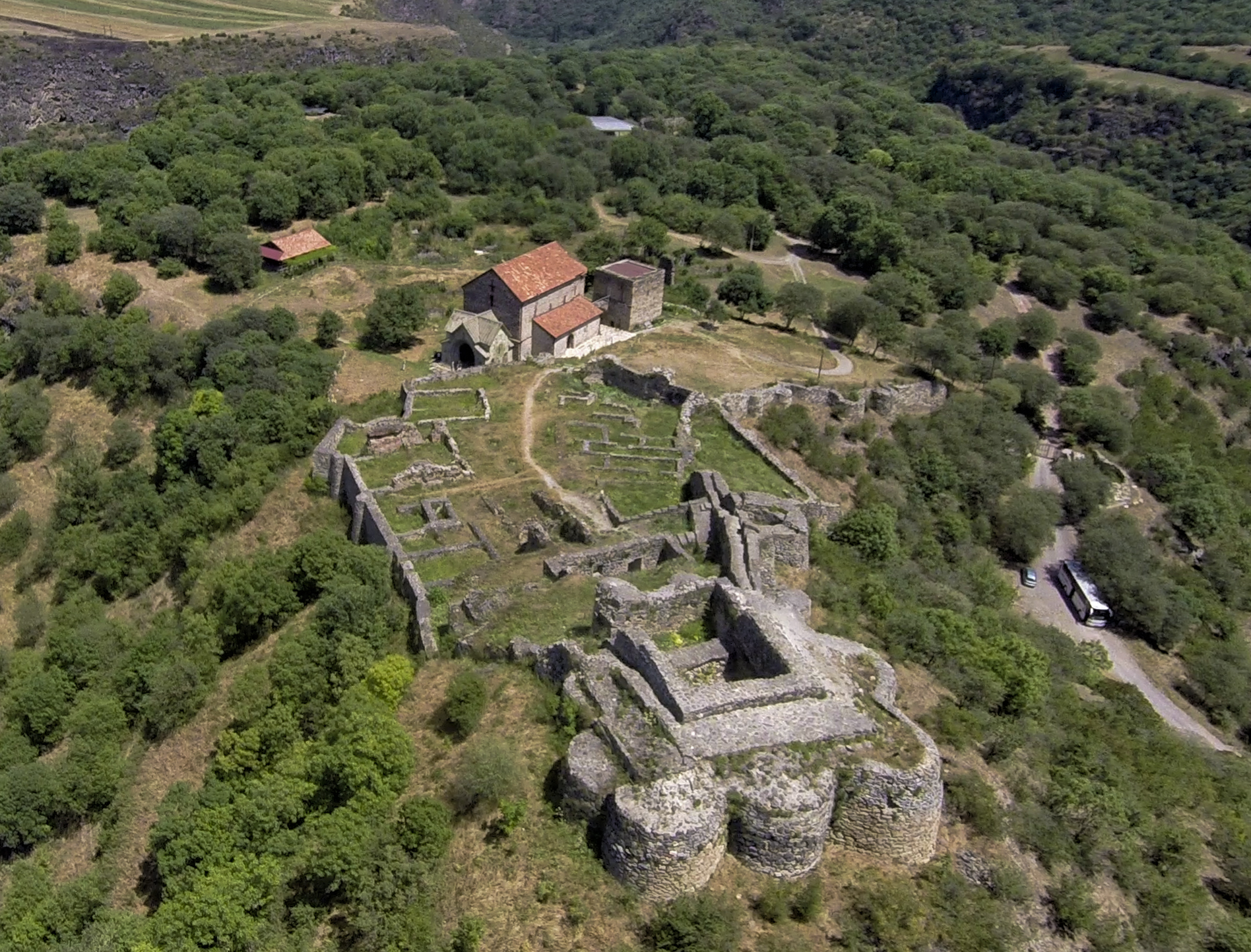
Overhead view of the Dmanisi historic site

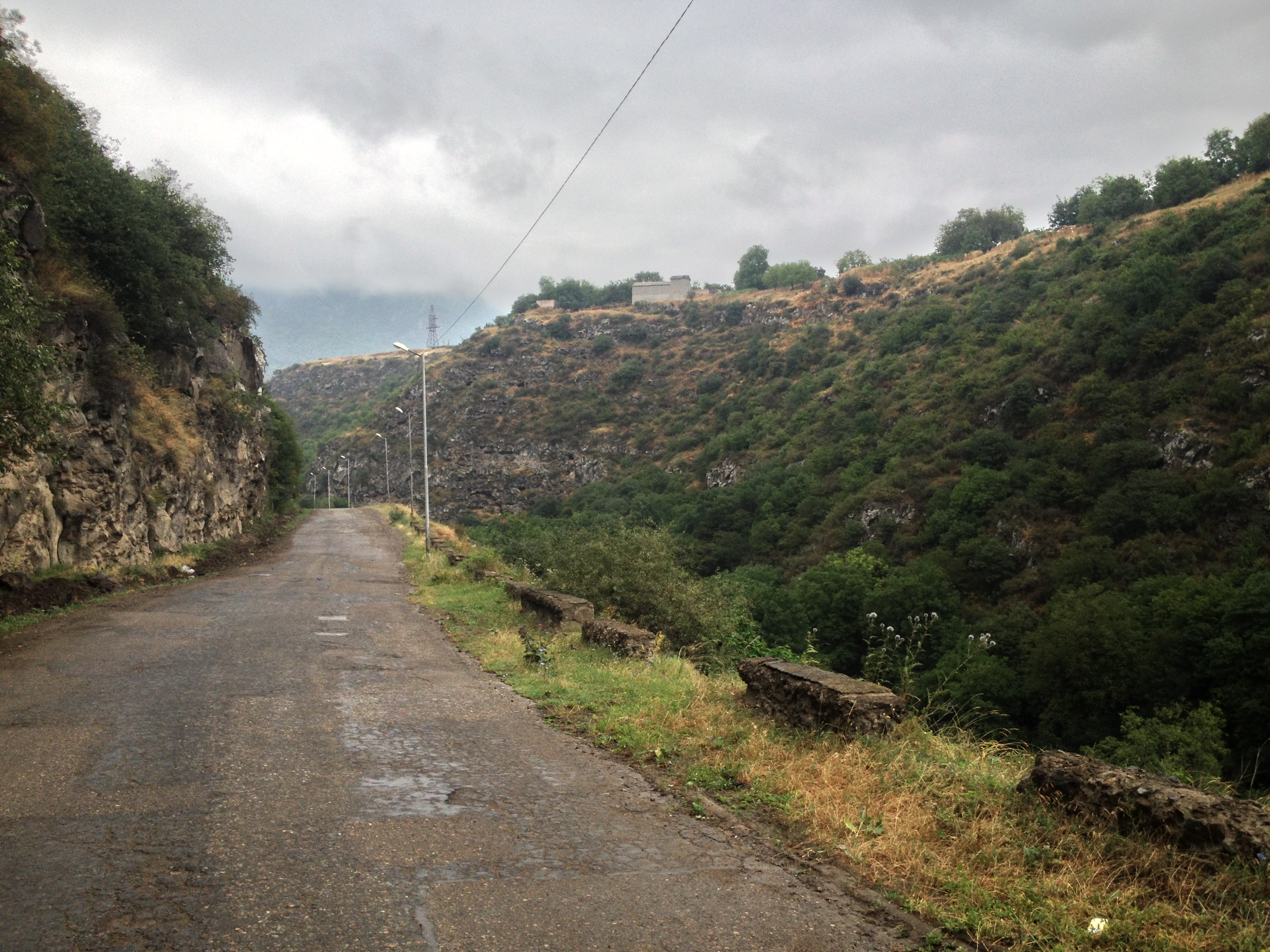
Road of Vardisubani

== See also ==
- List of municipalities in Georgia (country)
