= Mashavera =

- Mashavera River passing near Dmanisi, 2014.
- Native name: მაშავერა (Georgian)

Location
- Country: Georgia

Physical characteristics
- Mouth: Khrami
  - coordinates: 41.4364°N 44.7150°E
- Length: 66 km (41 mi)
- Basin size: 1,390 km^{2} (540 sq mi)

Basin features
- Progression: Khrami→ Kura→ Caspian Sea

The Mashavera (Georgian: მაშავერა) is a river of southern Georgia. It is 66 km (41 mi) long, and has a 1,390 km^{2} (540 sq mi) drainage basin. It is a right tributary of the Khrami, which in turn is a tributary of the Kura. It flows through the towns of Dmanisi and Bolnisi.
