= David Lordkipanidze =

Georgian anthropologist and archaeologist

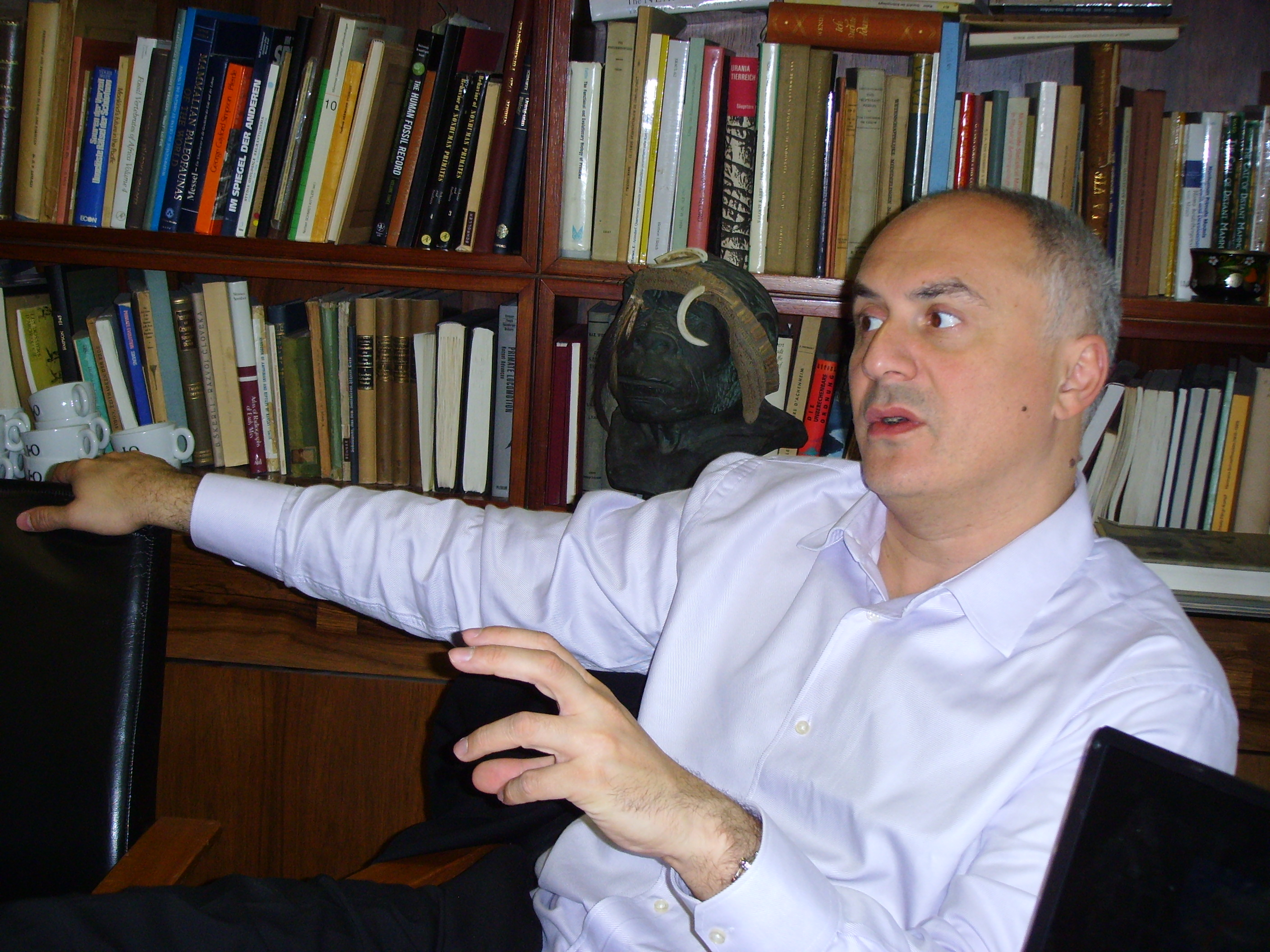
David O. Lordkipanidze

David Lordkipanidze (Georgian: დავით ლორთქიფანიძე; born 5 August 1963, in Tbilisi) is a Georgian anthropologist and archaeologist, Professor (2004), Dr.Sc. (2002), Corresponding Member of the Georgian National Academy of Sciences (2009), Full Member of the Georgian National Academy of Sciences (2018), and since 2004 the General Director of the Georgian National Museum (GNM). He is a son of the archaeologist Otar Lordkipanidze.

== Biography ==
Lordkipanidze graduated from Tbilisi State University in 1985, specialising in geology and geography. He subsequently pursued postgraduate studies at the Institute of Geography of the Russian Academy of Sciences in Moscow. He received a PhD in geography in 1992 and a Doctor of Science degree in 2001.

David Lordkipanidze is best known for his discovery of the hominin fossil, first named Homo georgicus, but later reclassified as Homo erectus. Conducting excavation at Dmanisi in Georgia, he found skulls of an early hominin thought to be a precursor of Homo erectus. Subsequently, four fossil skeletons were found, showing a species still with primitive features in its skull and upper body but with relatively advanced spines and lower limbs, providing greater mobility. They represent a stage soon after the transition from Homo habilis to Homo erectus, and have been dated at 1.8 million years before the present.

Lordkipanidze has received many awards, including the Georgia's Order of Honour (2000), Award of the Prince of Monaco (2001), the French Order of "Palmes Academiques" (2002), the Rolex Award for Enterprise (2004), Georgian National Award in Science and Technology (2004), the French Order of Honour (2006), Accademia Nazionale dei Lincei Fabio Frassetto International Prize (2008), Humboldt Research Award (2014) and the Goethe Medal (2016).

He was appointed Director General of the Georgian National Museum (GNM) in 2004. In 2007 he became both a Foreign Member of the United States National Academy of Sciences and a Fellow of the World Academy of Art and Science (U.S.).
