= Dmanisi =

Dmanisi დმანისი Başkeçid
- Town
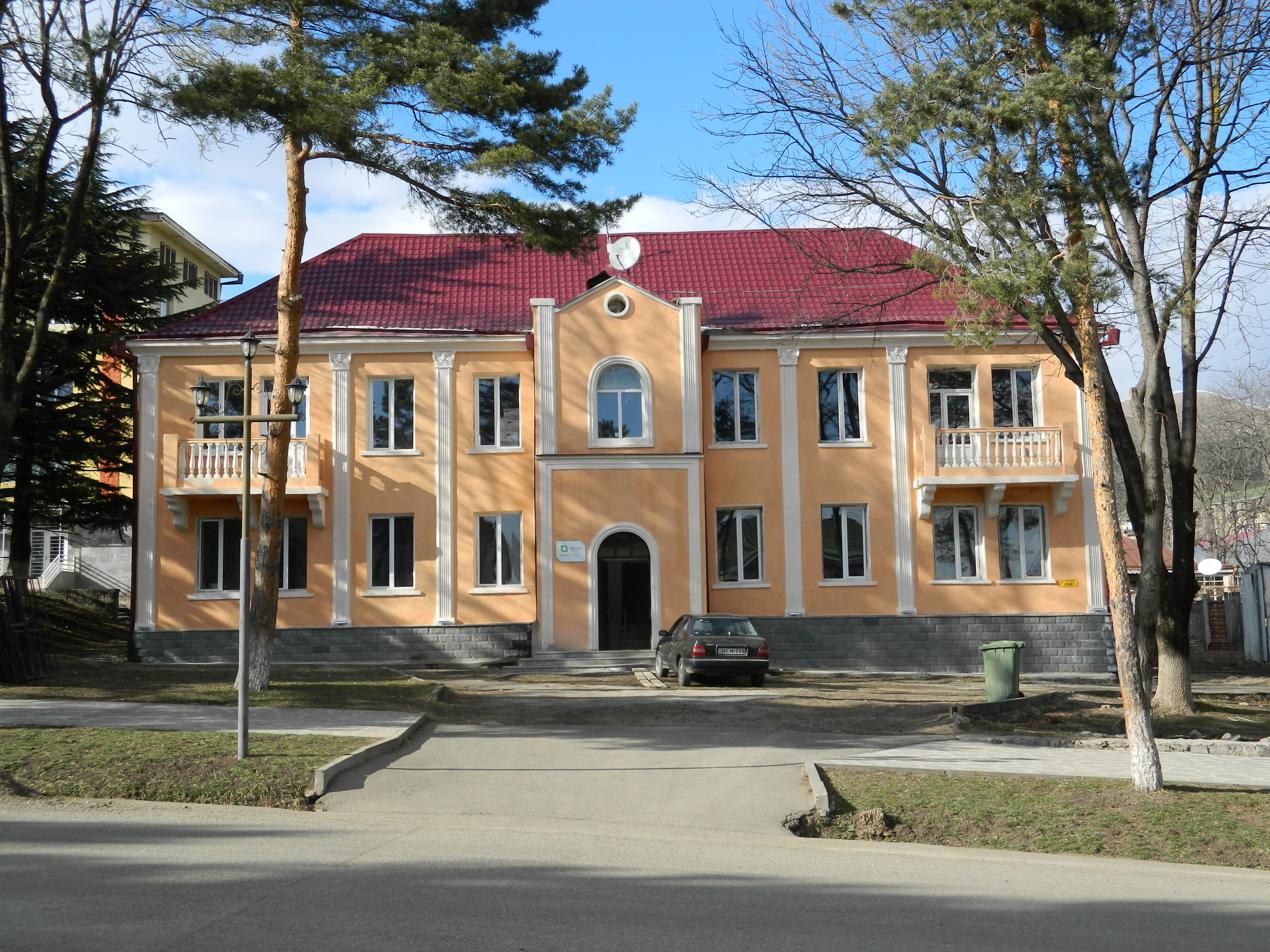
- Election administration office
- Interactive map of Dmanisi
- Location within Georgia Location within Kvemo Kartli
- Coordinates: 41°19′54″N 44°12′13″E
- Country: Georgia
- Region: Kvemo Kartli
- District: Dmanisi
- Elevation: 1,250 m (4,100 ft)

Population (2024)
  - Total: 3,050
- Time zone: UTC+4 (Georgian Time)
  - Summer (DST): UTC+5

Dmanisi (Georgian: დმანისი, romanized: dmanisi, pronounced [dmanisi], Azerbaijani: Başkeçid) is a town and archaeological site in the Kvemo Kartli region of Georgia approximately 93 km southwest of the nation's capital Tbilisi in the river valley of Mashavera.

Abandoned in the 1700s, Bashkichet (Башкичети) was resettled in 1844 to 2000 by Russian sectarian Dukhobortsy exiled from Taurida Governorate. It was renamed Dmansi (Дманиси) from the ancient Mongol duman, meaning "military or administrative unit".

It is the site of Dmanisi Hominid Skulls, which are dated to 1.8 million years ago, making them the earliest dated human remains in Eurasia. A series of skulls which had diverse physical traits, discovered at Dmanisi in the early 2000s, led to the hypothesis that many separate species in the genus Homo were in fact a single lineage. Also known as Skull 5, D4500 is the fifth skull to be discovered in Dmanisi.

== History ==
The area around the town of Dmanisi has been settled since the Early Bronze Age. In the 6th century an Orthodox Christian cathedral named "Dmanisi Sioni" was built there. The oldest written record of the town is in the 9th century as a possession of the Arab emirate of Tbilisi. Located on the confluence of trading routes and cultural influences, Dmanisi was particularly important, growing into a major commercial center of medieval Georgia. The town was taken by the Seljuk Turks in the 1080s and by the Georgian kings David the Builder and Demetrios I between 1123 and 1125. The Turco-Mongol armies under Timur laid waste to the town in the 14th century. Sacked again by the Turkomans in 1486, Dmanisi never recovered and declined to a scarcely inhabited village by the 18th century. The castle was controlled by the House of Orbeliani.

== Archaeological site ==
Dmanisi Sioni cathedral, part of the Dmanisi historic site.

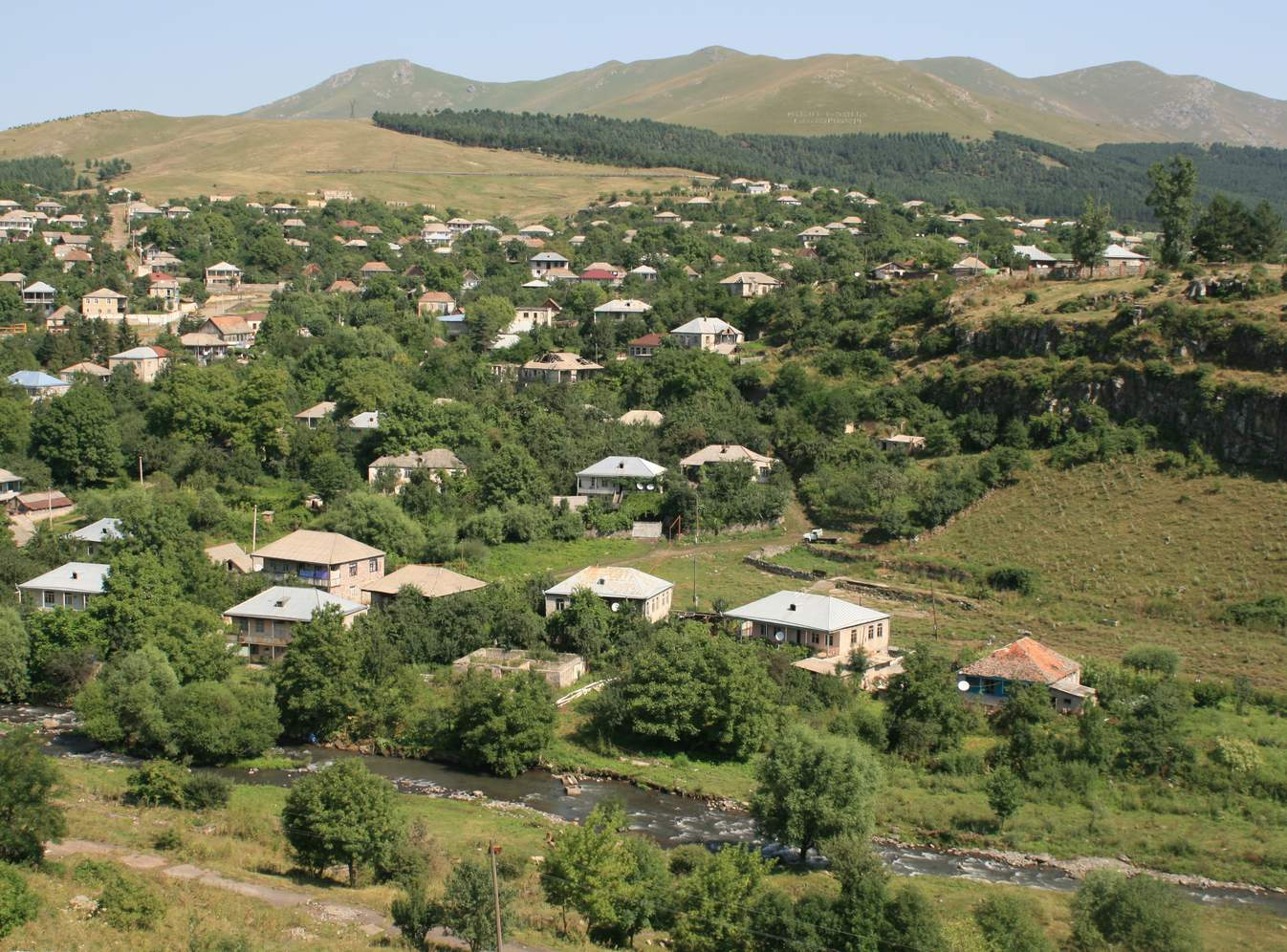
View of Dmanisi from across the Mashavera river.

Extensive archaeological studies began in the area in 1936 and continued in the 1960s. Beyond a rich collection of ancient and medieval artifacts and the ruins of various buildings and structures, unique remains of prehistoric animals and humans have been unearthed. Some of the animal bones were identified by the Georgian paleontologist A. Vekua with the teeth of the extinct rhino Dicerorhinus etruscus etruscus in 1983.

This species dates back presumably to the early Pleistocene epoch. The discovery of primitive stone tools in 1984 led to increasing interest to the archaeological site. In 1991, a team of Georgian scholars was joined by the German archaeologists from Römisch-Germanisches Zentralmuseum, and later the U.S., French and Spanish researchers.

=== Homo erectus georgicus ===
Early human (or hominin) fossils, originally named Homo georgicus and now considered Homo erectus georgicus, were found at Dmanisi between 1991 and 2005. At 1.8 million years old, they are now believed to be a subspecies of Homo erectus and not a separate species of Homo. These fossils represent the earliest known human presence in the Caucasus.

Subsequently, four fossil skeletons were found, showing a species primitive in its skull and upper body but with relatively advanced spines and lower limbs. A 2017 study suggests they represent a stage soon after the transition from Homo habilis to Homo erectus.

Human habitation in the Caucasus goes back to the remotest antiquity. The hominin remains discovered in 1991 by David Lordkipanidze at Dmanisi, Kvemo Kartli (1.8 million years old) are the oldest found outside Africa. Neanderthal remains have been found at Ortvala Klde (1973) and elsewhere in the Caucasus (36,000–50,000 years old).

The Dmanisi hominin remains are still making an impact on the paleontological community. As of 2014 the Dmanisi skull 5 is in the middle of the controversy: many hominin fossils formerly thought to be different species may not have been separate species at all. Several early members of the genus Homo were possibly one evolving lineage.

== Gallery ==

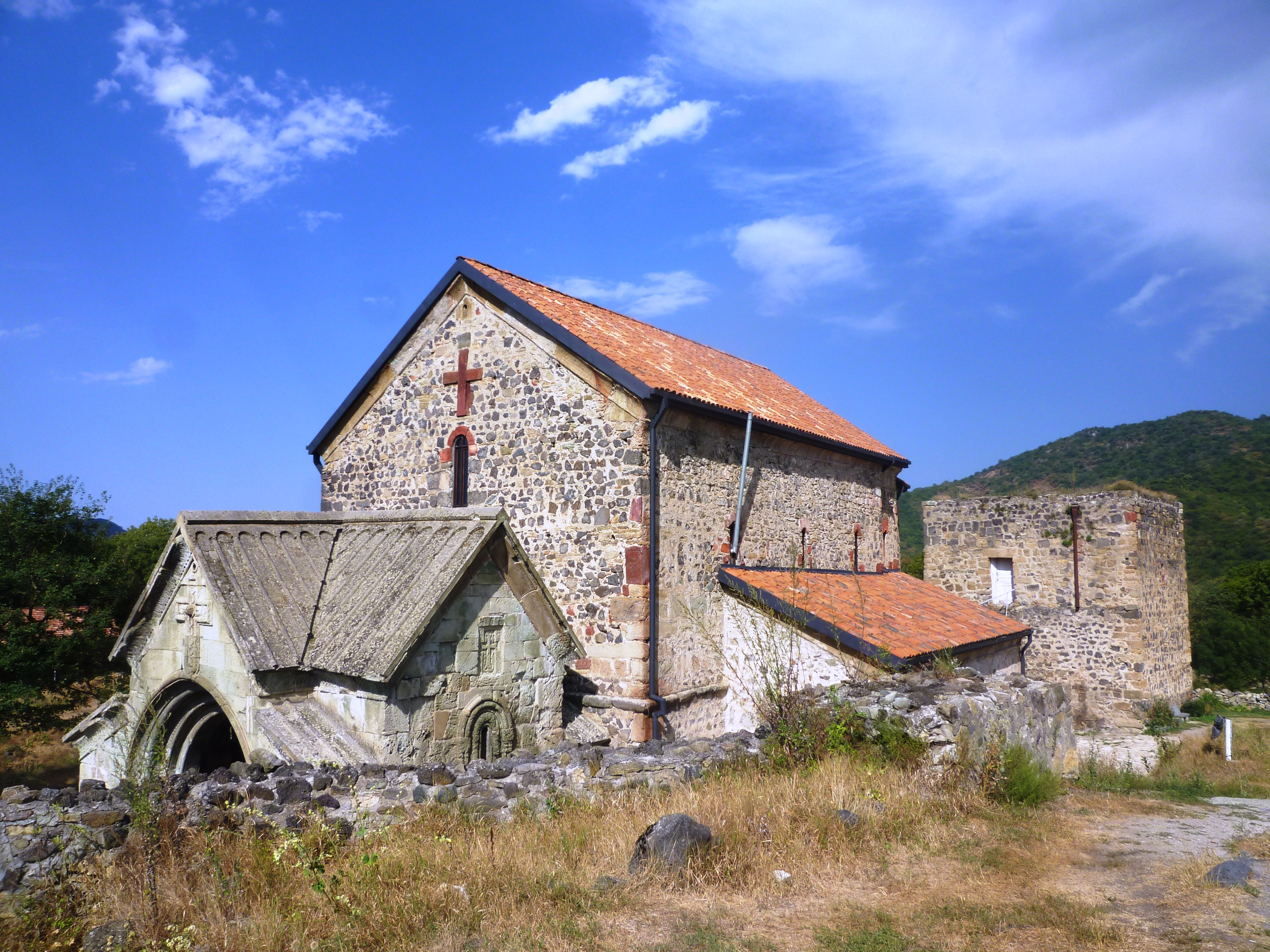
Dmanisi Sioni cathedral

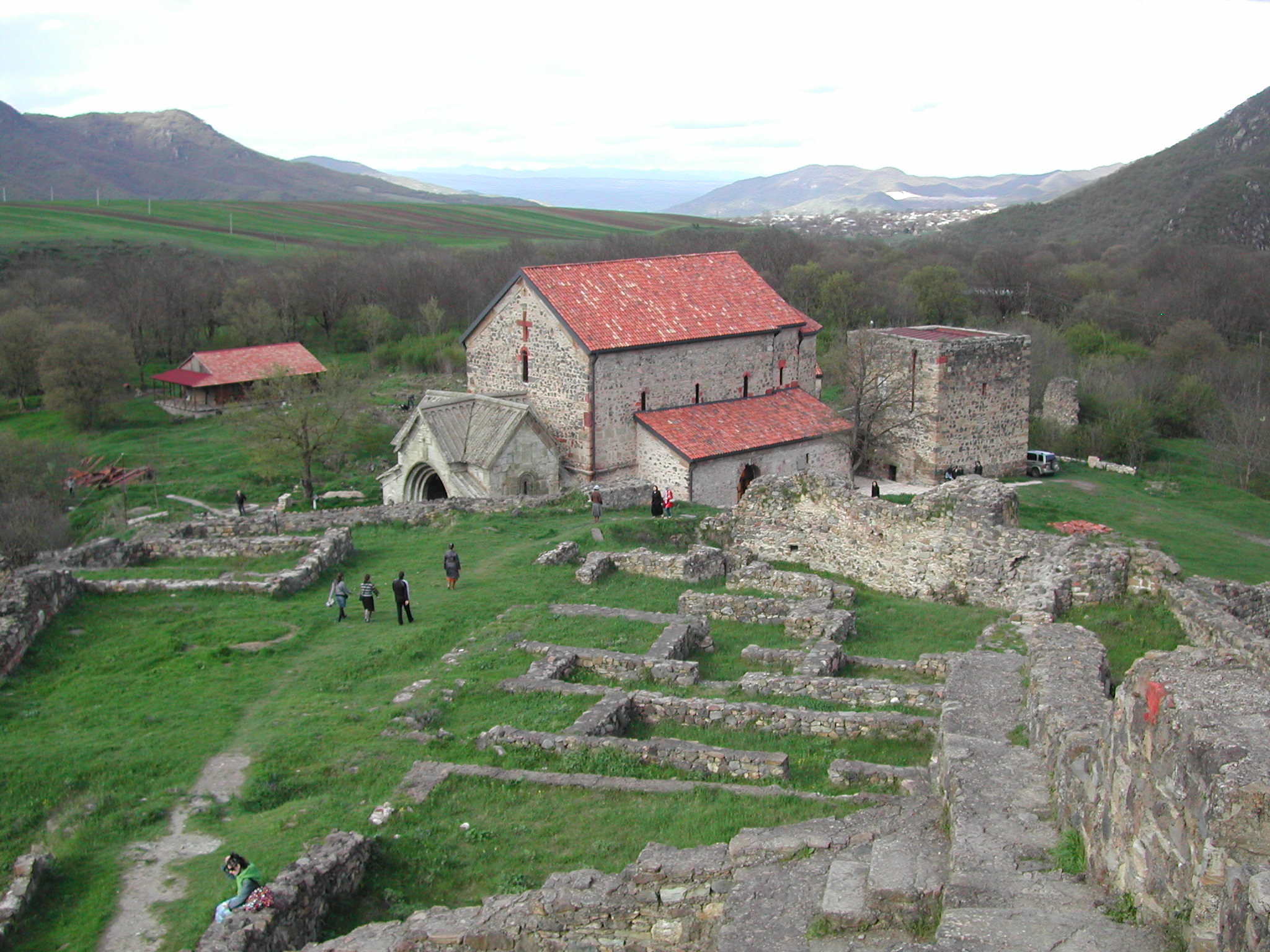

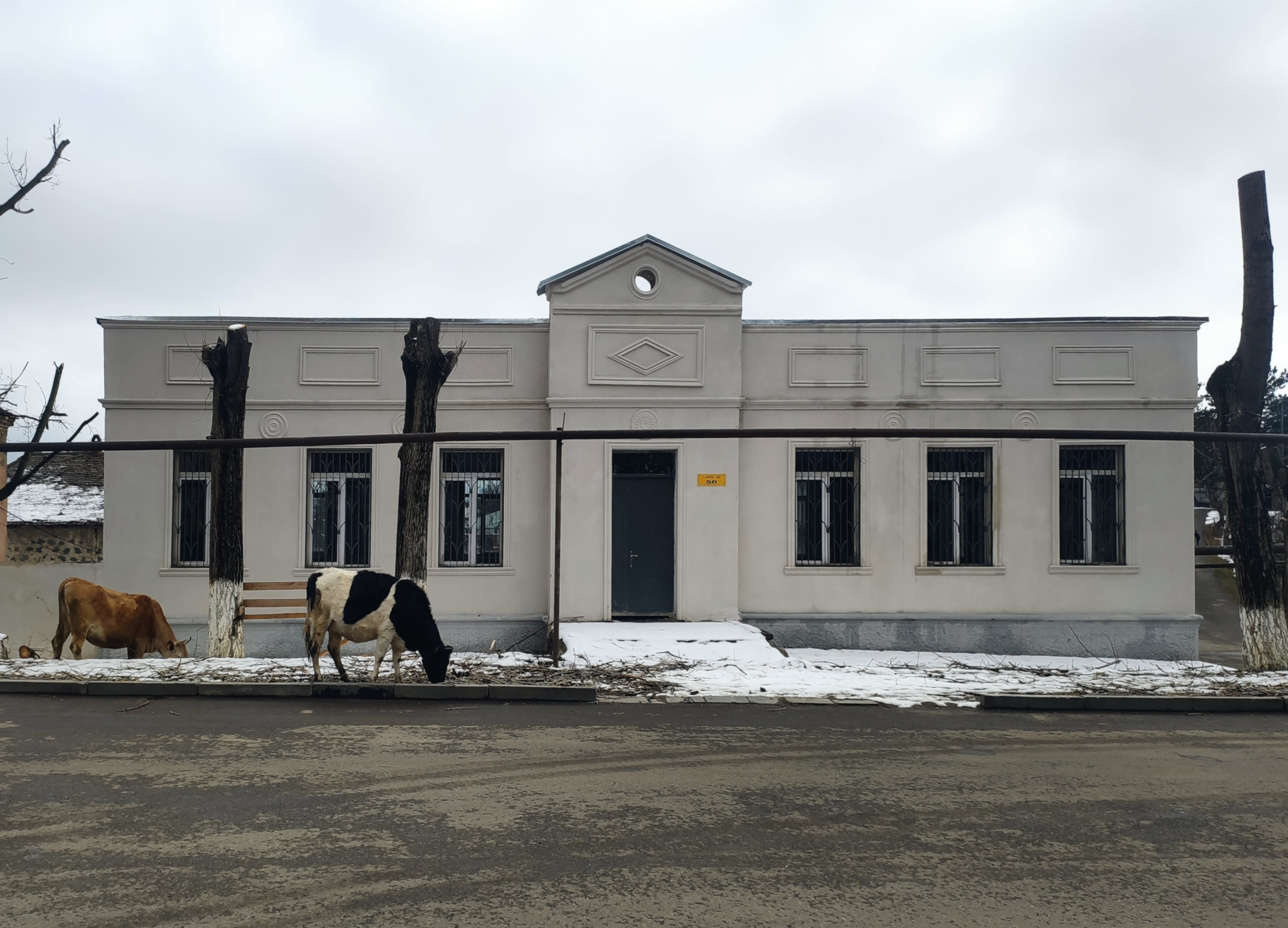
National Food Agency in Dmanisi

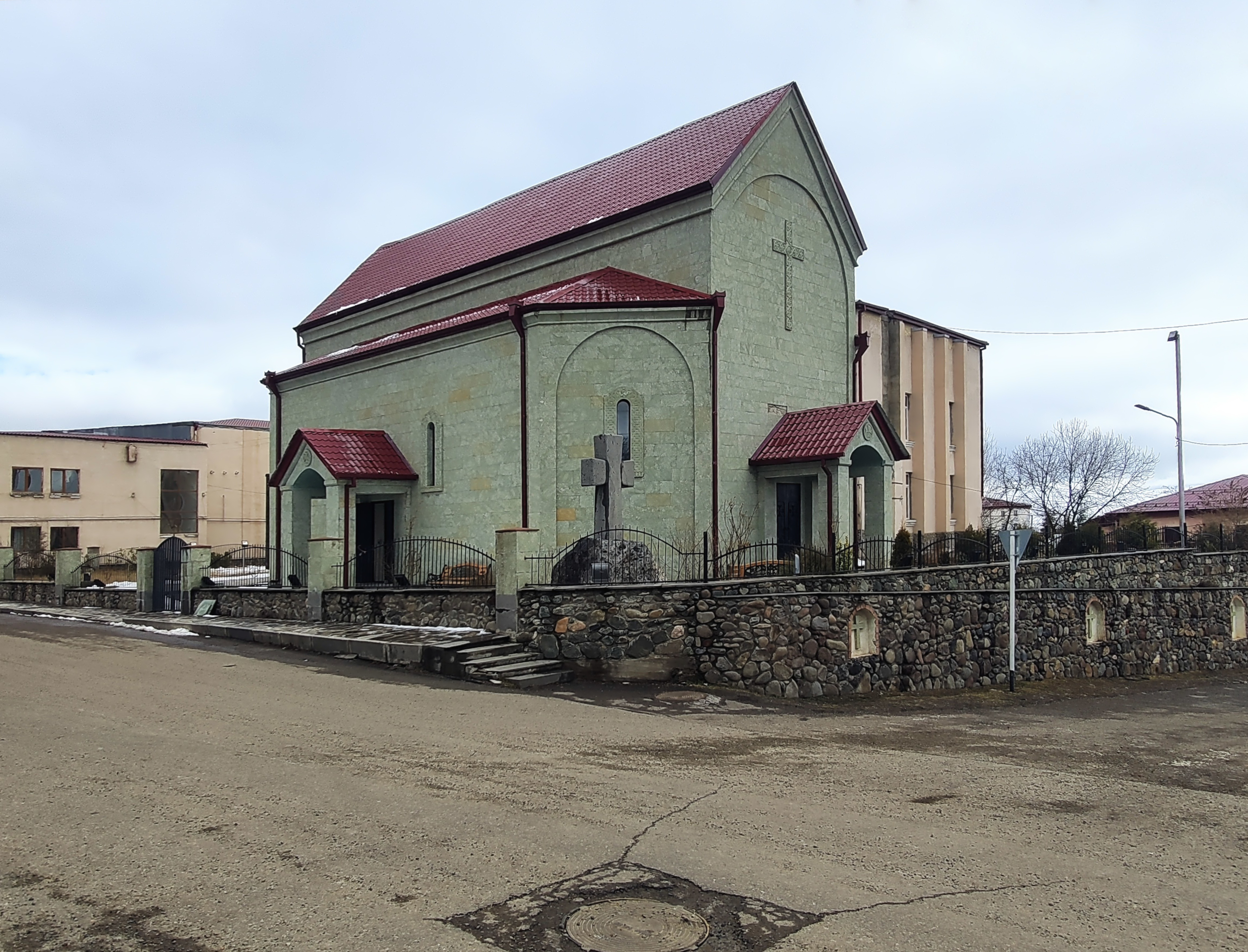
Dmanisi Pentecostal Church

== See also ==
- Prehistoric Georgia
- Human evolution
- List of human evolution fossils
- Kvemo Kartli
