= Aurora mountain skink =

There are two species of skink named Aurora mountain skink, both found in the Philippines:

- Parvoscincus hadros
- Parvoscincus tagapayo
