= Parvoscincus lawtoni =

Conservation status
- Data Deficient (IUCN 3.1)

Scientific classification
- Kingdom: Animalia
- Phylum: Chordata
- Class: Reptilia
- Order: Squamata
- Family: Scincidae
- Genus: Parvoscincus
- Species: P. lawtoni

Binomial name
- Parvoscincus lawtoni (W.C. Brown & Alcala, 1980)

Synonyms
- Sphenomorphus lawtoni W.C. Brown & Alcala, 1980

Species of lizard

Parvoscincus lawtoni is a species of lizard in the subfamily Sphenomorphinae of the family Scincidae (skinks). The species is endemic to the Philippines.

== Etymology ==
The specific name, lawtoni, is in honor of Filipino biologist E. Lawton Alcala, who was the brother of junior binomial authority Angel Alcala.

== Description ==
P. lawtoni may attain a snout-to-vent length (SVL) of 4.7 cm (1.9 in). The frontoparietals are fused. The tympanum is exposed. There are 13–15 lamellae under the fourth toe.

== Geographic range ==
P. lawtoni is found on the island of Luzon, the Philippines.

== Habitat ==
The preferred natural habitat of P. lawtoni is unknown. The holotype was collected in an agricultural area, at an elevation of 950 m (3,120 ft).

== Reproduction ==
P. lawtoni is oviparous.

== Taxonomy ==
P. lawtoni is a member of the S. steerei species group.
