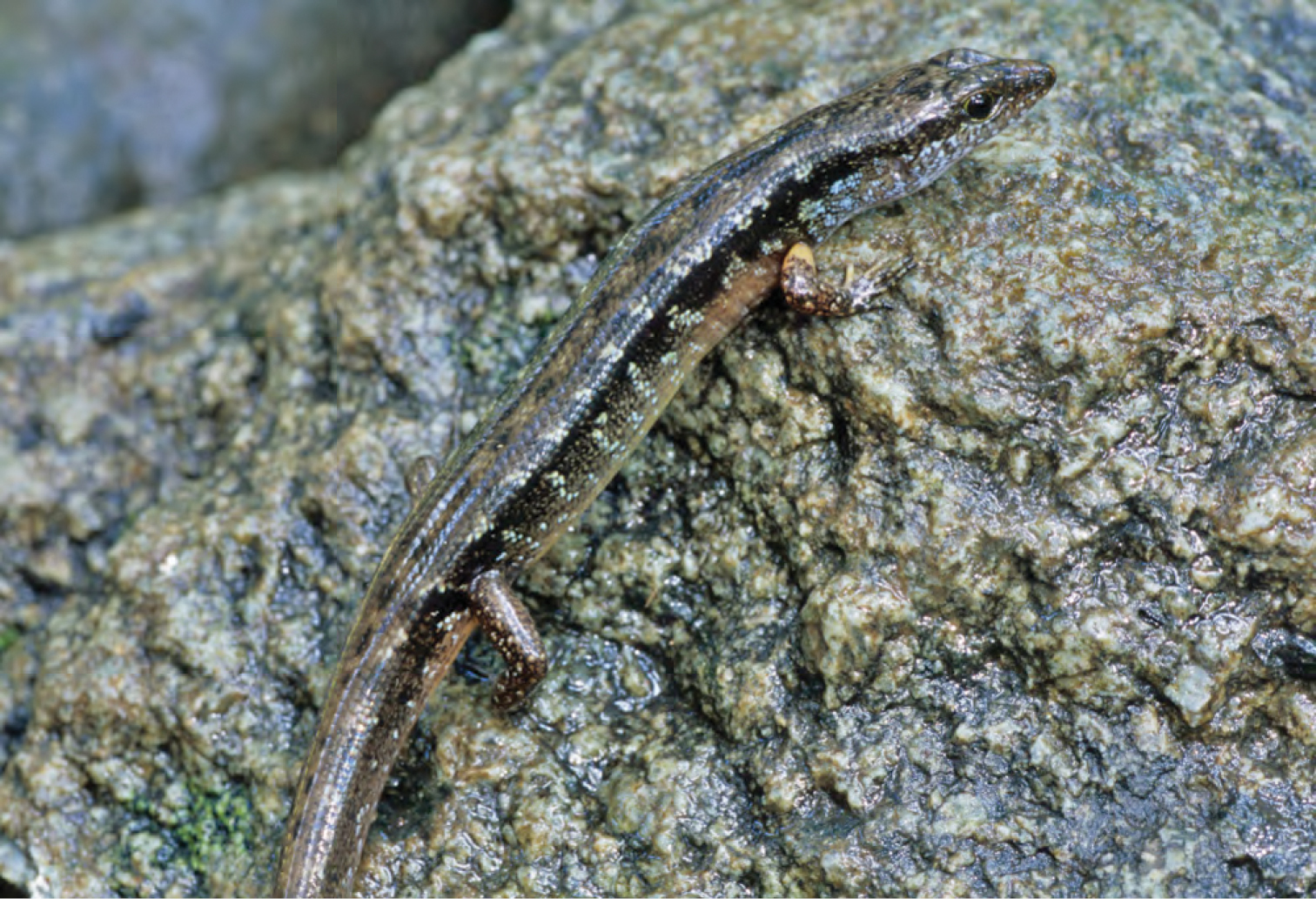

Conservation status
- Least Concern (IUCN 3.1)

Scientific classification
- Kingdom: Animalia
- Phylum: Chordata
- Class: Reptilia
- Order: Squamata
- Family: Scincidae
- Genus: Parvoscincus
- Species: P. leucospilos

Binomial name
- Parvoscincus leucospilos (Peters, 1872)
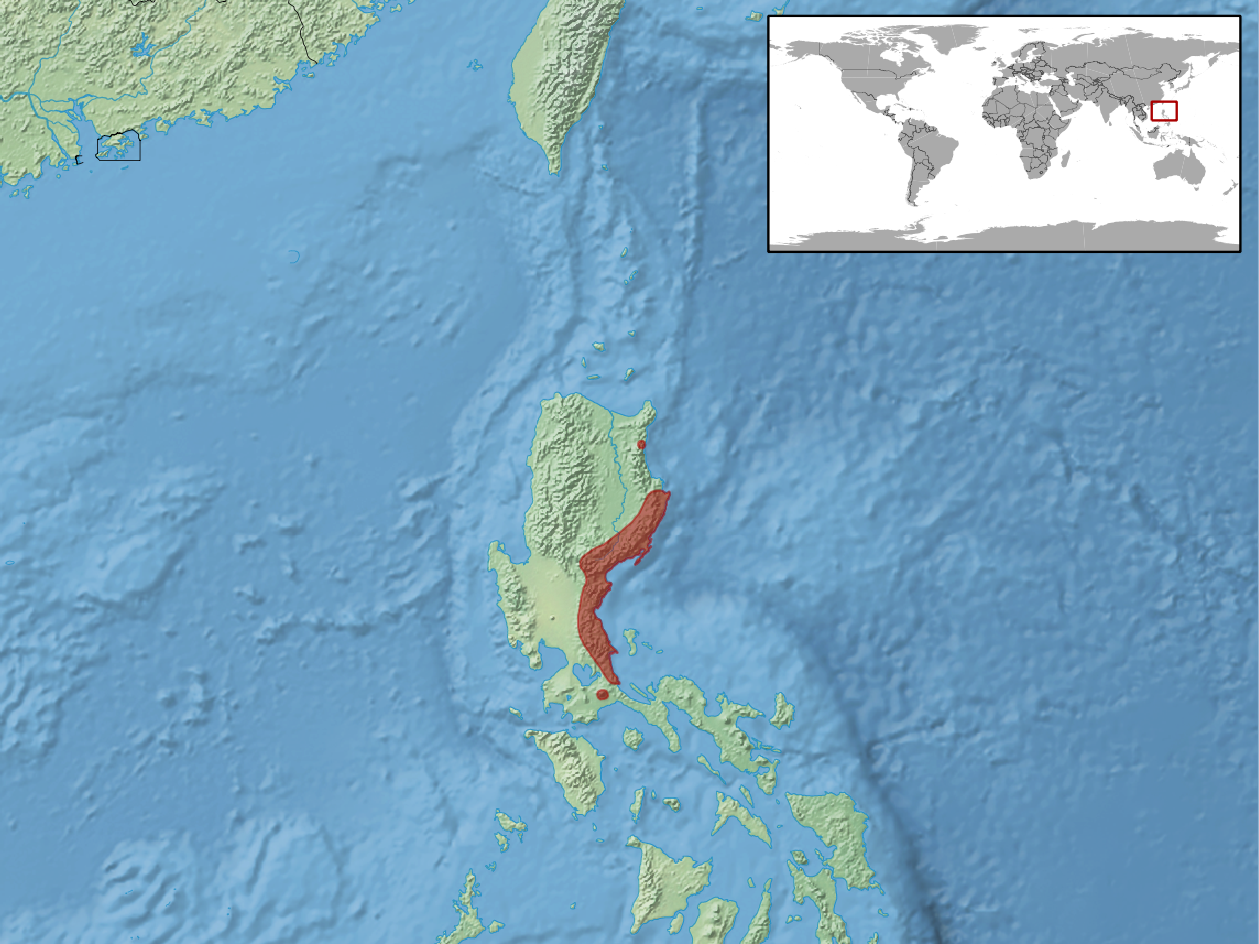

Synonyms
- Lygosoma leucospilos

= Parvoscincus leucospilos =

White-spotted sphenomorphus

Species of lizard

Parvoscincus leucospilos, the white-spotted sphenomorphus, is a species of skink endemic to the Philippines.

== Habitation and distribution ==
It is found between 300 and 1,200 m above sea levels in the forests of central and southern Sierra Madre Mountain Range (including Mount Banahaw) of Luzon Island.

This skink hides under rocks or in debris in the banks of streams and rivers. When threatened by predators, such as snakes, it may dive and stay under water for a long time.
