= Mactan Hindu Ganesha Statue =

Filipino Artifact

A black and white photograph of the discovered statue of the Hindu elephant god Ganesha (left) and a clay medallion of a Buddhist Bodhisattva (right), before the icons were destroyed in World War 2, show that Hinduism and Buddhism became the respective religions in Cebu and Palawan during the era of Precolonial Philippines.

A crude Buddhist medallion and a copper statue of a Hindu Deity, Ganesha, was found by American anthropologist Henry Otley Beyer in 1921 in an ancient site in Puerto Princesa, Palawan and in Mactan, Cebu. The crudeness of the artifacts indicates they are of local reproduction. Unfortunately, these icons were destroyed during World War II. However, black and white photographs of these icons still survive.
