= Parvoscincus arvindiesmosi =

Conservation status
- Least Concern (IUCN 3.1)

Scientific classification
- Kingdom: Animalia
- Phylum: Chordata
- Class: Reptilia
- Order: Squamata
- Family: Scincidae
- Genus: Parvoscincus
- Species: P. arvindiesmosi

Binomial name
- Parvoscincus arvindiesmosi Linkem & R.M. Brown, 2013

Species of lizard

Parvoscincus arvindiesmosi is a species of lizard in the subfamily Sphenomorphinae of the family Scincidae (skinks). The species is endemic to the Philippines.

== Etymology ==
The specific name, arvindiesmosi, is in honor of Filipino herpetologist Arvin Cantor Diesmos.

== Description ==
Adults of P. arvindiesmosi have a snout-to-vent length (SVL) of 3.6–4.3 cm (1.4–1.7 in). The snout is narrow. There are three preoculars. The dorsal scales are not striated. There are apical pits on the dorsal scales and on the scales of the legs.

== Geographic range ==
P. arvindiesmosi is found on the island of Luzon, the Philippines.

== Habitat ==
The preferred natural habitat of P. arvindiesmosi is forest.

== Behavior ==
P. arvindiesmosi is terrestrial. It shelters under fallen logs and in leaf litter.

== Reproduction ==
P. arvindiesmosi is oviparous.
