= Parvoscincus kitangladensis =

Conservation status
- Least Concern (IUCN 3.1)

Scientific classification
- Kingdom: Animalia
- Phylum: Chordata
- Class: Reptilia
- Order: Squamata
- Suborder: Scinciformata
- Infraorder: Scincomorpha
- Family: Sphenomorphidae
- Genus: Parvoscincus
- Species: P. kitangladensis

Binomial name
- Parvoscincus kitangladensis (Brown, 1995)

Species of lizard

Parvoscincus kitangladensis is a species of skink found in the Philippines.
