= Athylia avara =

Scientific classification
- Kingdom: Animalia
- Phylum: Arthropoda
- Class: Insecta
- Order: Coleoptera
- Suborder: Polyphaga
- Infraorder: Cucujiformia
- Family: Cerambycidae
- Genus: Athylia
- Species: A. avara

Binomial name
- Athylia avara Pascoe, 1864

Species of beetle

Athylia avara is a species of beetle in the family Cerambycidae. It was described by Pascoe in 1864.
