= Athylia tholana =

Scientific classification
- Kingdom: Animalia
- Phylum: Arthropoda
- Class: Insecta
- Order: Coleoptera
- Suborder: Polyphaga
- Infraorder: Cucujiformia
- Family: Cerambycidae
- Genus: Athylia
- Species: A. tholana

Binomial name
- Athylia tholana (Gressitt, 1940)

Species of beetle

Athylia tholana is a species of beetle in the family Cerambycidae. It was described by Judson Linsley Gressitt in 1940.
