= Athylia =

Scientific classification
- Kingdom: Animalia
- Phylum: Arthropoda
- Class: Insecta
- Order: Coleoptera
- Suborder: Polyphaga
- Infraorder: Cucujiformia
- Family: Cerambycidae
- Subfamily: Lamiinae
- Tribe: Apomecynini
- Genus: Athylia; Pascoe, 1864

Genus of beetles

Athylia is a genus of beetles in the family Cerambycidae, containing the following species:

- Athylia albomarmorata Breuning, 1943
- Athylia avara Pascoe, 1864
- Athylia drescheri (Fisher, 1936)
- Athylia fasciata (Fisher, 1936)
- Athylia fisheri (Gilmour, 1948)
- Athylia flavovittata (Breuning, 1938)
- Athylia fusca Fisher, 1925
- Athylia fuscosticta Breuning & Jong, 1941
- Athylia fuscovittata Breuning, 1939
- Athylia gressitti (Gilmour, 1948)
- Athylia laevicollis (Pascoe, 1859)
- Athylia nobilis Breuning, 1960
- Athylia ornata Fisher, 1925
- Athylia persimilis Breuning, 1939
- Athylia pulcherrima (Breuning, 1938)
- Athylia pulchra (Fisher, 1925)
- Athylia punctithorax Breuning, 1939
- Athylia quadristigma (Gressitt, 1940)
- Athylia signata (Pic, 1926)
- Athylia similis (Fisher, 1925)
- Athylia tholana (Gressitt, 1940)
- Athylia vanessoides Breuning, 1956
- Athylia venosa (Pascoe, 1864)
- Athylia viduata (Pascoe, 1864)
