= Athylia drescheri =

Scientific classification
- Kingdom: Animalia
- Phylum: Arthropoda
- Class: Insecta
- Order: Coleoptera
- Suborder: Polyphaga
- Infraorder: Cucujiformia
- Family: Cerambycidae
- Genus: Athylia
- Species: A. drescheri

Binomial name
- Athylia drescheri (Fisher, 1936)

Species of beetle

Athylia drescheri is a species of beetle in the family Cerambycidae. It was described by Fisher in 1936.
