= Athylia signata =

Scientific classification
- Kingdom: Animalia
- Phylum: Arthropoda
- Class: Insecta
- Order: Coleoptera
- Suborder: Polyphaga
- Infraorder: Cucujiformia
- Family: Cerambycidae
- Genus: Athylia
- Species: A. signata

Binomial name
- Athylia signata (Pic, 1926)

Species of beetle

Athylia signata is a species of beetle in the family Cerambycidae. It was described by Maurice Pic in 1926.
