= Parvoscincus beyeri =

Conservation status
- Vulnerable (IUCN 3.1)

Scientific classification
- Kingdom: Animalia
- Phylum: Chordata
- Class: Reptilia
- Order: Squamata
- Family: Scincidae
- Genus: Parvoscincus
- Species: P. beyeri

Binomial name
- Parvoscincus beyeri (Taylor, 1922)

Synonyms
- Sphenomorphus beyeri Taylor, 1922; Parvoscincus beyeri — Linkem, A. Diesmos & R. Brown, 2011

Species of lizard

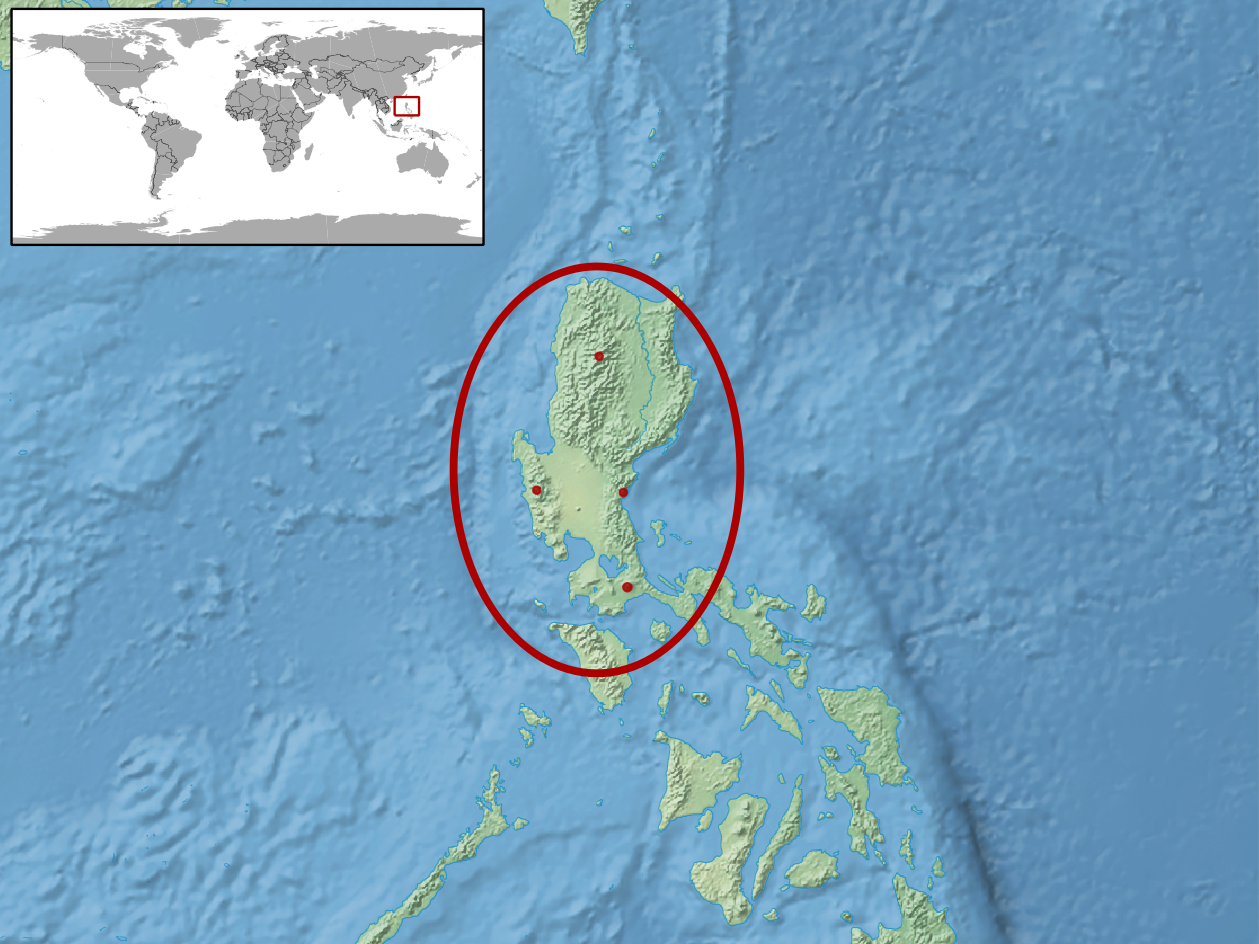
The geographic distribution map of Parvoscincus beyeri

Parvoscincus beyeri, also known commonly as Beyer's sphenomorphus, is a species of skink, a lizard in the family Scincidae. The species is endemic to the Philippines.

== Etymology ==
The specific name, beyeri, is in honor of American ethnologist Henry Otley Beyer.

== Geographic range ==
In the Philippines, P. beyeri is found on the island of Luzon.

== Habitat ==
The preferred natural habitat of P. beyeri is forest, at altitudes of 1,000–1,600 m (3,280–5,250 ft).

== Description ==
Large for its genus, P. beyeri may attain a snout-to-vent length (SVL) of 7.3 cm (2.9 in). Dorsally, it is brown with white spots. Ventrally, it is bright golden yellow.

== Behavior ==
P. beyeri hides in leaf litter and thick moss, and under rotten fallen logs, on the forest floor.

== Reproduction ==
The mode of reproduction of P. beyeri is unknown.
