= Athylia laevicollis =

Scientific classification
- Kingdom: Animalia
- Phylum: Arthropoda
- Class: Insecta
- Order: Coleoptera
- Suborder: Polyphaga
- Infraorder: Cucujiformia
- Family: Cerambycidae
- Genus: Athylia
- Species: A. laevicollis

Binomial name
- Athylia laevicollis (Pascoe, 1859)

Species of beetle

Athylia laevicollis is a species of beetle in the family Cerambycidae. It was described by Pascoe in 1859.
