= Parvoscincus laterimaculatus =

Conservation status
- Data Deficient (IUCN 3.1)

Scientific classification
- Kingdom: Animalia
- Phylum: Chordata
- Class: Reptilia
- Order: Squamata
- Family: Scincidae
- Genus: Parvoscincus
- Species: P. laterimaculatus

Binomial name
- Parvoscincus laterimaculatus (Brown & Alcala, 1980)
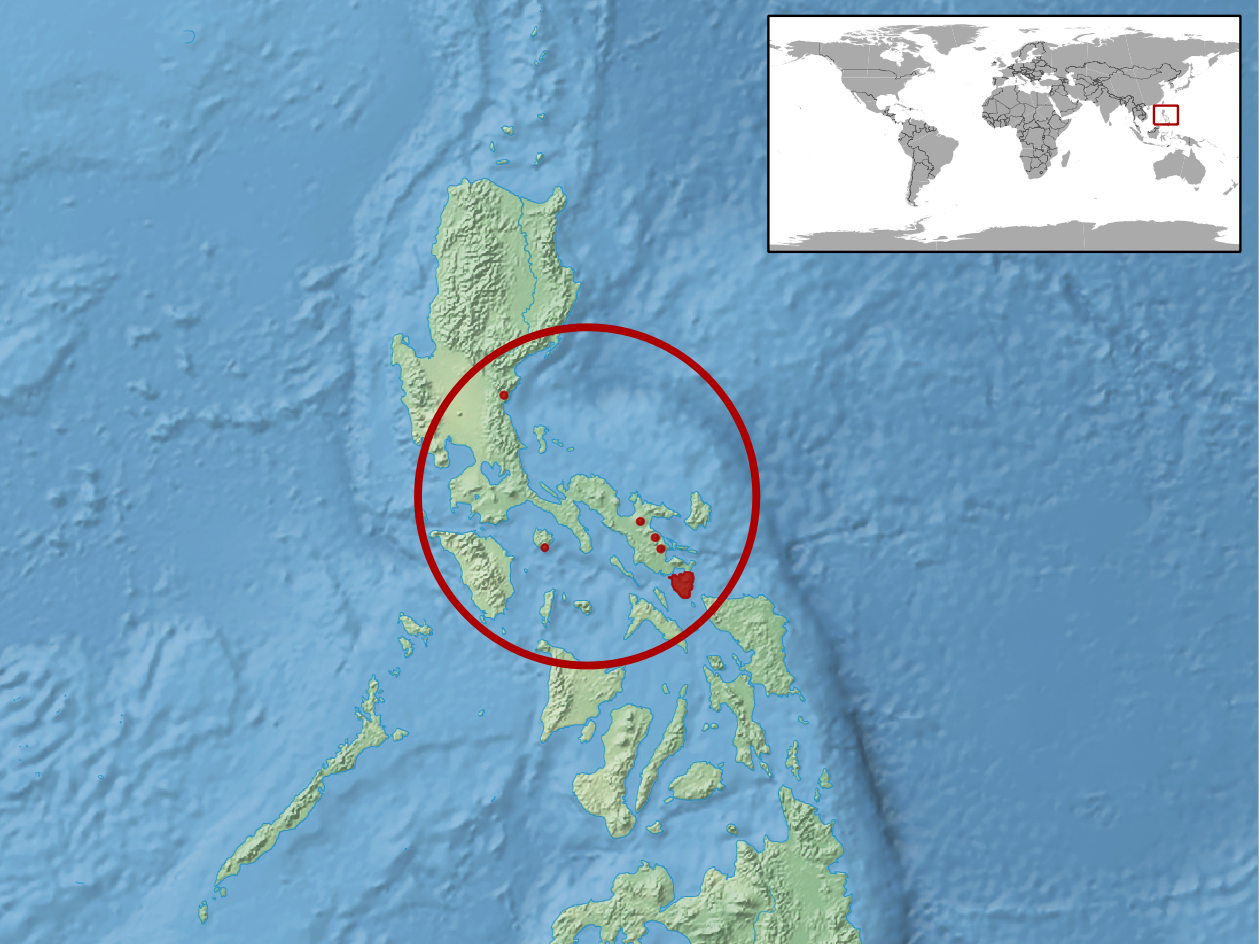

Species of lizard

Parvoscincus laterimaculatus is a species of skink found in the Philippines.
