= Parvoscincus manananggalae =

Scientific classification
- Kingdom: Animalia
- Phylum: Chordata
- Class: Reptilia
- Order: Squamata
- Family: Scincidae
- Genus: Parvoscincus
- Species: P. manananggalae

Binomial name
- Parvoscincus manananggalae Siler, Linkem, Cobb, Watters, Cummings, Diesmos, & Brown, 2014

Species of lizard

Parvoscincus manananggalae, also known as the Aurora aquatic skink, is a species of skink endemic to the island of Luzon, the Philippines.
