= Parvoscincus tikbalangi =

Conservation status
- Critically Endangered (IUCN 3.1)

Scientific classification
- Kingdom: Animalia
- Phylum: Chordata
- Class: Reptilia
- Order: Squamata
- Family: Scincidae
- Genus: Parvoscincus
- Species: P. tikbalangi

Binomial name
- Parvoscincus tikbalangi Siler, Linkem, Cobb, Watters, Cummings, Diesmos, & Brown, 2014

Species of lizard

Parvoscincus tikbalangi, also known as the Sierra Madres aquatic skink, is a species of skink endemic to the island of Luzon, the Philippines.
