= Athylia viduata =

Scientific classification
- Kingdom: Animalia
- Phylum: Arthropoda
- Class: Insecta
- Order: Coleoptera
- Suborder: Polyphaga
- Infraorder: Cucujiformia
- Family: Cerambycidae
- Genus: Athylia
- Species: A. viduata

Binomial name
- Athylia viduata (Pascoe, 1864)

Synonyms
- Ebaeides viduata Pascoe, 1864

Species of beetle

Athylia viduata is a species of longhorn beetle in the subfamily Lamiinae. It was described by Pascoe in 1864.
