= Parvoscincus agtorum =

Scientific classification
- Kingdom: Animalia
- Phylum: Chordata
- Class: Reptilia
- Order: Squamata
- Family: Scincidae
- Genus: Parvoscincus
- Species: P. agtorum

Binomial name
- Parvoscincus agtorum Linkem & Brown, 2013

Species of lizard

Parvoscincus agtorum is a species of skink found in the Philippines.
