= Mount Mayabobo =

Mountain in Quezon, Philippines

- Location within Luzon Location within Philippines

Highest point
- Elevation: 300 m (980 ft)
- Coordinates: 13°59′N 121°27′E

Geography
- Country: Philippines
- Region: Calabarzon
- Province: Quezon
- City/municipality: Candelaria

Geology
- Mountain type: Cinder cone

Mount Mayabobo is a cinder cone situated at the base of Mount Banahaw, in Barangay Mayabobo, Candelaria, Quezon in Luzon island, Philippines. Approximately with a height of 300 metres (980 ft), it is a tourist destination for local residents of Candelaria and nearby municipalities, since it has a telecommunication site at its summit for sight-seeing and hiking.

== Sources ==
- Global Volcanism Program: Banáhao: Synonyms and Subfeatures
