= Athylia fuscosticta =

Scientific classification
- Kingdom: Animalia
- Phylum: Arthropoda
- Class: Insecta
- Order: Coleoptera
- Suborder: Polyphaga
- Infraorder: Cucujiformia
- Family: Cerambycidae
- Genus: Athylia
- Species: A. fuscosticta

Binomial name
- Athylia fuscosticta Breuning & Jong, 1941

Species of beetle

Athylia fuscosticta is a species of beetle in the family Cerambycidae. It was described by Stephan von Breuning and Jong in 1941.
