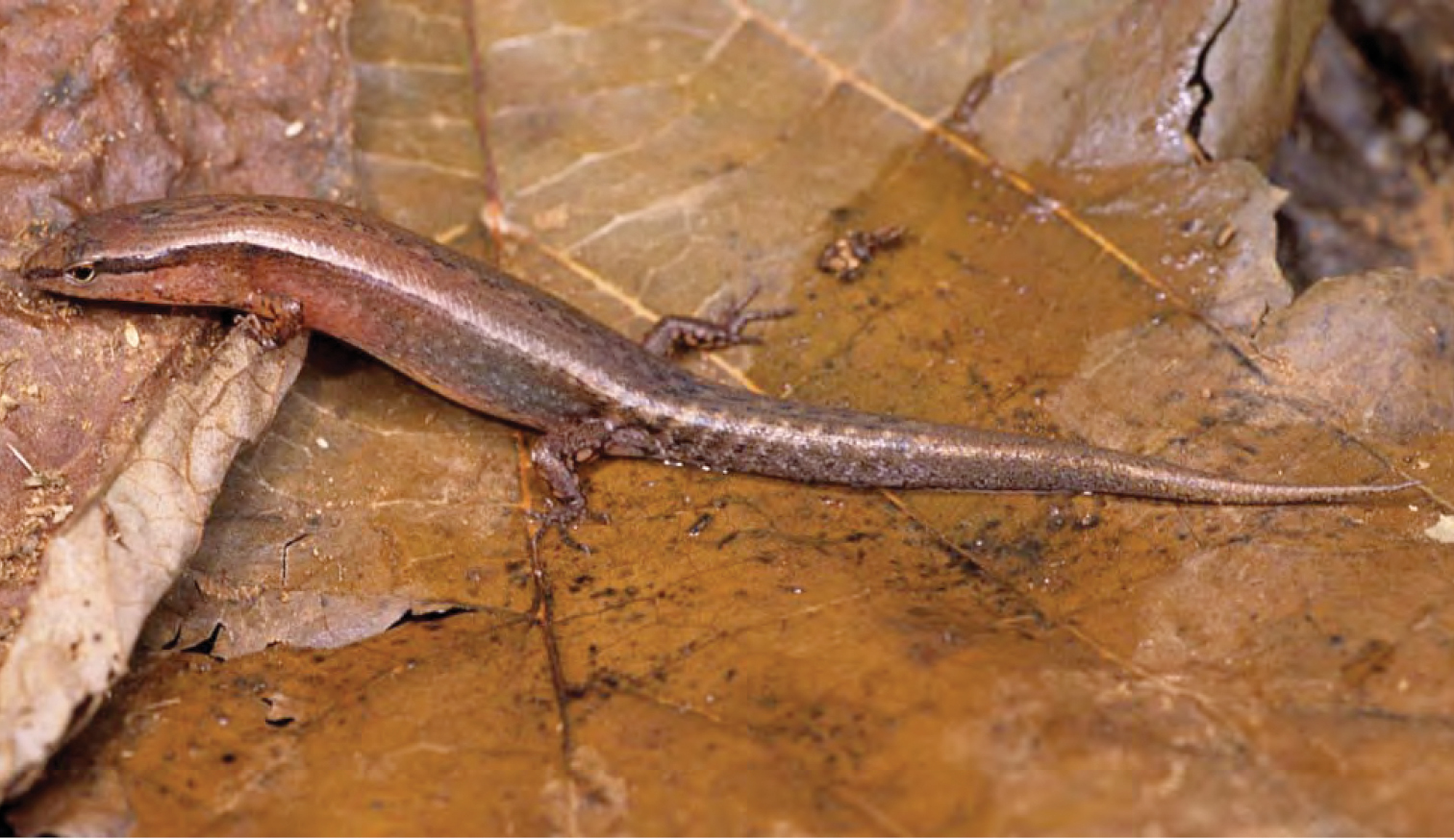
- Parvoscincus decipiens

Scientific classification
- Kingdom: Animalia
- Phylum: Chordata
- Class: Reptilia
- Order: Squamata
- Family: Scincidae
- Subfamily: Sphenomorphinae
- Genus: Parvoscincus; Ferner, R. Brown & Greer, 1997

Type species
- Parvoscincus sisoni Ferner, R. Brown & Greer, 1997

Diversity
- 24 species, see text.

= Parvoscincus =

Genus of lizards

Parvoscincus is a genus of skinks, lizards in the family Scincidae. The genus is endemic to the Philippines.

== Description ==
Species in the genus Parvoscincus are small to moderately sized skinks; the maximum snout-vent length (SVL) ranges from 32 mm (1.3 in) in Parvoscincus tagapayo to 87 mm (3.4 in) in Parvoscincus hadros.

== Species ==
The genus Parvoscincus contains 24 species which are recognized as being valid, many of them described in the 21st century.

- Parvoscincus abstrusus Linkem & R. Brown, 2013
- Parvoscincus agtorum Linkem & R. Brown, 2013
- Parvoscincus arvindiesmosi Linkem & R. Brown, 2013
- Parvoscincus aurorus Linkem & R. Brown, 2013
- Parvoscincus banahaoensis Linkem & R. Brown, 2013
- Parvoscincus beyeri (Taylor, 1922) – Beyer's sphenomorphus
- Parvoscincus boyingi (R. Brown, Linkem, Diesmos, Balete, Duya & Ferner, 2010) – Boying’s Zambales mountain skink
- Parvoscincus decipiens (Boulenger, 1894) – black-sided sphenomorphus
- Parvoscincus duwendorum Siler, Linkem, Cobb, Watters, Cummings, Diesmos & R. Brown, 2014 – cordillera aquatic skink
- Parvoscincus hadros (R. Brown, Linkem, Diesmos, Balete, Duya & Ferner, 2010) – Aurora mountain skink
- Parvoscincus igorotorum (R. Brown, Linkem, Diesmos, Balete, Duya & Ferner, 2010) – Igorot cordillera mountain skink
- Parvoscincus jimmymcguirei Linkem & R. Brown, 2013
- Parvoscincus kitangladensis (W. Brown, 1995)
- Parvoscincus laterimaculatus (W. Brown & Alcala, 1980)
- Parvoscincus lawtoni (W. Brown & Alcala, 1980)
- Parvoscincus leucospilos (W. Peters, 1872) – white-spotted sphenomorphus
- Parvoscincus luzonensis (Boulenger, 1894) – highland sphenomorphus
- Parvoscincus manananggalae Siler, Linkem, Cobb, Watters, Cummings, Diesmos & R. Brown, 2014 – Aurora aquatic skink
- Parvoscincus palaliensis Linkem & R. Brown, 2013
- Parvoscincus palawanensis (W. Brown & Alcala, 1961)
- Parvoscincus sisoni Ferner, R. Brown & Greer, 1997
- Parvoscincus steerei (Stejneger, 1908) – Steere's sphenomorphus
- Parvoscincus tagapayo (R. Brown, McGuire, Ferner & Alcala, 1999) – Aurora mountain skink
- Parvoscincus tikbalangi Siler, Linkem, Cobb, Watters, Cummings, Diesmos & R. Brown, 2014 – Sierra Madres aquatic skink

Nota bene: A binomial authority in parentheses indicates that the species was originally described in a genus other than Parvoscincus.
