= Parvoscincus luzonensis =

Conservation status
- Near Threatened (IUCN 3.1)

Scientific classification
- Kingdom: Animalia
- Phylum: Chordata
- Class: Reptilia
- Order: Squamata
- Suborder: Scinciformata
- Infraorder: Scincomorpha
- Family: Sphenomorphidae
- Genus: Parvoscincus
- Species: P. luzonensis

Binomial name
- Parvoscincus luzonensis (Boulenger, 1895)

Species of lizard

The highland sphenomorphus (Parvoscincus luzonensis) is a species of skink found in the Philippines.
