= Parvoscincus aurorus =

Scientific classification
- Kingdom: Animalia
- Phylum: Chordata
- Class: Reptilia
- Order: Squamata
- Family: Scincidae
- Genus: Parvoscincus
- Species: P. aurorus

Binomial name
- Parvoscincus aurorus Linkem & Brown, 2013

Species of lizard

Parvoscincus aurorus is a species of skink found in the Philippines.

== Habitat ==
Parvoscincus Aurorus' are generally found at the higher elevations of the Sierra Madre Occidental mountain range, in Aurora province.
