= Parvoscincus jimmymcguirei =

Scientific classification
- Kingdom: Animalia
- Phylum: Chordata
- Class: Reptilia
- Order: Squamata
- Family: Scincidae
- Genus: Parvoscincus
- Species: P. jimmymcguirei

Binomial name
- Parvoscincus jimmymcguirei Linkem & Brown, 2013

Species of lizard

Parvoscincus jimmymcguirei is a species of skink found in the Philippines.
