= Athylia fusca =

Scientific classification
- Kingdom: Animalia
- Phylum: Arthropoda
- Class: Insecta
- Order: Coleoptera
- Suborder: Polyphaga
- Infraorder: Cucujiformia
- Family: Cerambycidae
- Genus: Athylia
- Species: A. fusca

Binomial name
- Athylia fusca Fisher, 1925

Species of beetle

Athylia fusca is a species of beetle in the family Cerambycidae. It was described by Fisher in 1925.
