= Parvoscincus banahaoensis =

Scientific classification
- Kingdom: Animalia
- Phylum: Chordata
- Class: Reptilia
- Order: Squamata
- Family: Scincidae
- Genus: Parvoscincus
- Species: P. banahaoensis

Binomial name
- Parvoscincus banahaoensis Linkem & Brown, 2013

Species of lizard

The Banahao forest skink (Parvoscincus banahaoensis) is a species of True Lizards in the Scincidae family endemic to the Mount Banahaw in the Philippines.
