= Athylia venosa =

Scientific classification
- Kingdom: Animalia
- Phylum: Arthropoda
- Class: Insecta
- Order: Coleoptera
- Suborder: Polyphaga
- Infraorder: Cucujiformia
- Family: Cerambycidae
- Genus: Athylia
- Species: A. venosa

Binomial name
- Athylia venosa (Pascoe, 1864)

Species of beetle

Athylia venosa is a species of beetle in the family Cerambycidae. It was described by Pascoe in 1864.
