= Parvoscincus palawanensis =

Conservation status
- Vulnerable (IUCN 3.1)

Scientific classification
- Kingdom: Animalia
- Phylum: Chordata
- Class: Reptilia
- Order: Squamata
- Family: Scincidae
- Genus: Parvoscincus
- Species: P. palawanensis

Binomial name
- Parvoscincus palawanensis (Brown & Alcala, 1961)
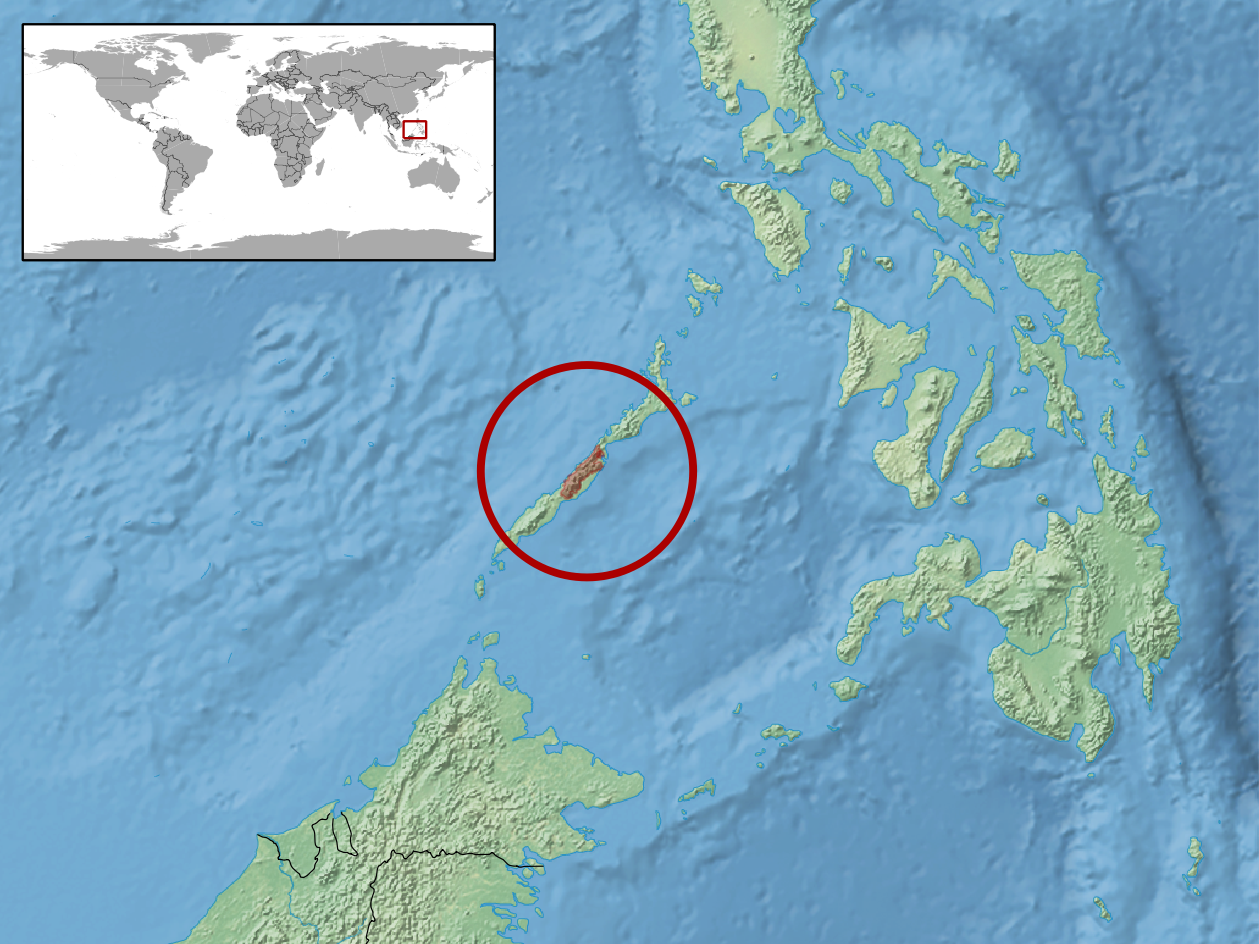

Species of reptile

Parvoscincus palawanensis is a species of skink found in the Philippines.
