= Parvoscincus igorotorum =

Conservation status
- Data Deficient (IUCN 3.1)

Scientific classification
- Kingdom: Animalia
- Phylum: Chordata
- Class: Reptilia
- Order: Squamata
- Family: Scincidae
- Genus: Parvoscincus
- Species: P. igorotorum

Binomial name
- Parvoscincus igorotorum (Brown, Linkem, Diesmos, Balete, Duya, & Ferner, 2010)

Species of lizard

The Igorot cordillera mountain skink (Parvoscincus igorotorum) is a species of skink found in the Philippines.
