= Banaue =

Municipality in Ifugao, Philippines

- Municipality
- Municipality of Banaue, Municipalité de Banaue
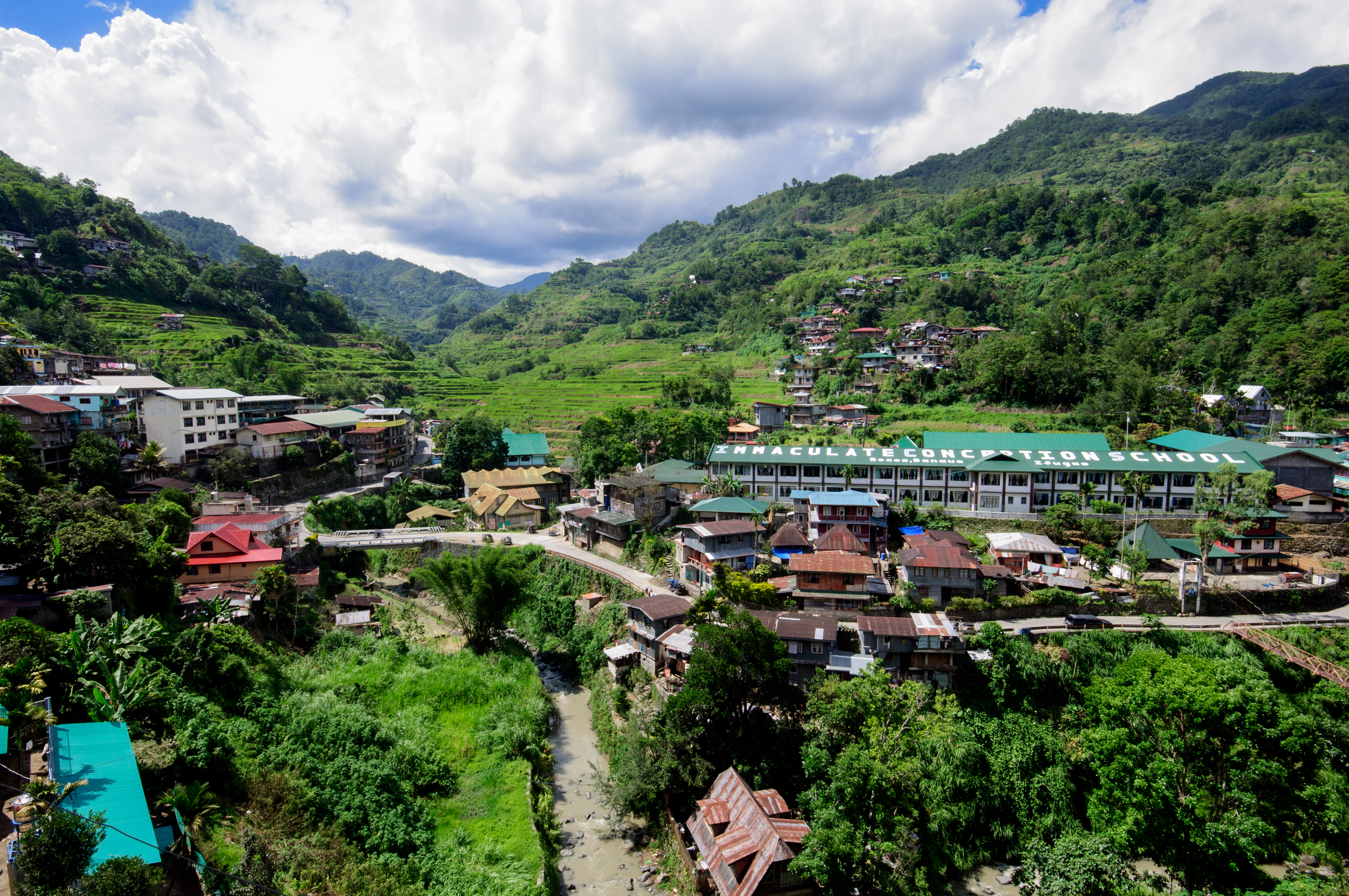
- Town of Banaue

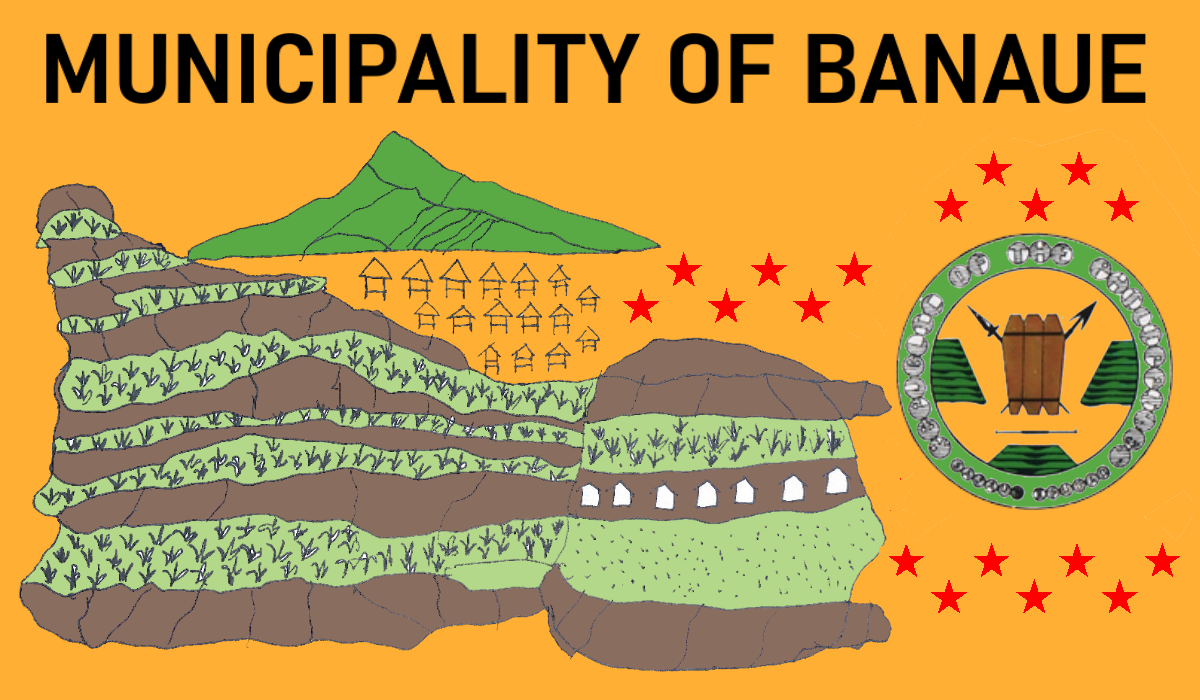
- Flag

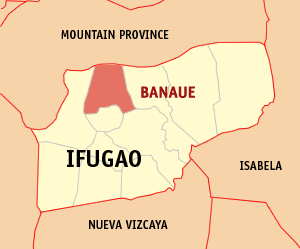
- Map of Ifugao with Banaue highlighted
- Interactive map of Banaue
- Location within the Philippines
- Coordinates: 16°54′43″N 121°03′41″E
- Country: Philippines
- Region: Cordillera Administrative Region
- Province: Ifugao
- District: Lone district
- Barangays: 18 (see Barangays)

Government
  - Type: Sangguniang Bayan
  - Mayor: Donald L. Mongolnon
  - Vice Mayor: Kendall Pung-ao T. Immoliap
  - Representative: Solomon Chungalao
  - Municipal Council: Members: Rogelio N. Immatong; Julius B. Tayaban; Roberto M. Immotna; Romando G. Mannod; Albert B. Magguling Sr.; Fermin P. Haclao Jr.; Karen Joy B. Luglug; Wilson A. Balungay
  - Electorate: 15,487 voters (2025)

Area
  - Total: 191.20 km^{2} (73.82 sq mi)
- Elevation: 1,303 m (4,275 ft)
- Highest elevation: 2,689 m (8,822 ft)
- Lowest elevation: 481 m (1,578 ft)

Population (2024 census)
  - Total: 20,143
  - Density: 105.35/km^{2} (272.86/sq mi)
  - Households: 4,306

Economy
  - Income class: 3rd municipal income class
  - Poverty incidence: 11.54% (2023)
  - Revenue: ₱ 156 million (2024)
  - Assets: ₱ 864.5 million (2024)
  - Expenditure: ₱ 190.1 million (2024)
  - Liabilities: ₱ 122.8 million (2024)

Service provider
  - Electricity: Ifugao Electric Cooperative (IFELCO)
- Time zone: UTC+8 (PST)
- ZIP code: 3601
- PSGC: 1402701000
- IDD : area code: +63 (0)74
- Native languages: Ifugao; Tuwali; Ilocano; Tagalog
- Website: www.banaue.gov.ph

Banaue (or alternatively spelled as Banawe) [bɐˈnawe], officially the Municipality of Banaue (Ilocano: Ili ti Banaue, Tagalog: Bayan ng Banaue), is a municipality in the province of Ifugao, Philippines. According to the 2024 census, it has a population of 20,143 people.

It is the site of a UNESCO World Heritage Site, the Batad Rice Terraces and Bangaan Rice Terraces.

== Etymology ==
Banaue is the Spanish spelling of Bannawor, the sitio which once hosted the Spanish local seat of government (now part of the poblacion area of the municipality). The name later extended to the entire municipality. The sitio was named after bannawor (also spelled banawor), the local Tuwali Ifugao common name for Hirundapus celebensis, a species of swift.

== History ==
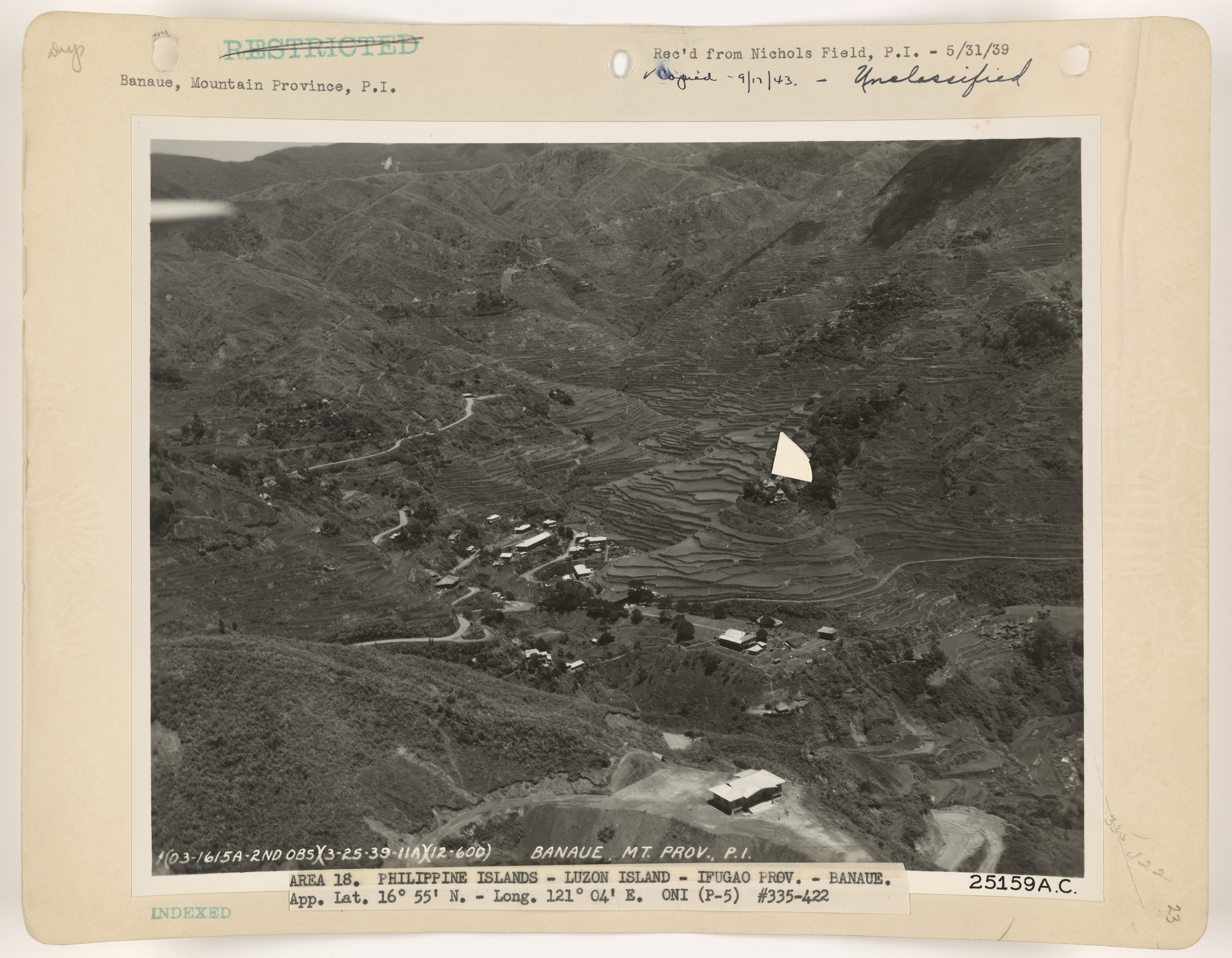
Aerial view of Banaue, 1939

In 1901, Banaue was first established as a municipal district under Mountain Province. Banaue was incorporated into a municipality in 1963. Since then, Banaue becomes one of the famous tourist destinations in Luzon.

== Geography ==
Banaue is situated 24.60 kilometres (15.29 mi) from the provincial capital Lagawe, and 375.26 kilometres (233.18 mi) from the country's capital city of Manila.

=== Barangays ===
Banaue is politically subdivided into 18 barangays. Each barangay consists of puroks and some have sitios.

- Amganad
- Anaba
- Balawis
- Bangaan
- Batad
- Bocos
- Banao
- Cambulo
- Ducligan
- Gohang
- Kinakin
- Uhaj
- Poblacion
- Poitan
- Pula
- San Fernando
- Tam-an
- View Point

=== Climate ===
Climate data for Banaue, Ifugao
Month	Jan	Feb	Mar	Apr	May	Jun	Jul	Aug	Sep	Oct	Nov	Dec	Year
Mean daily maximum °C (°F)	21 (70)	23 (73)	24 (75)	26 (79)	25 (77)	25 (77)	24 (75)	24 (75)	24 (75)	24 (75)	23 (73)	22 (72)	24 (75)
Mean daily minimum °C (°F)	15 (59)	15 (59)	16 (61)	18 (64)	19 (66)	19 (66)	19 (66)	19 (66)	19 (66)	18 (64)	17 (63)	16 (61)	18 (63)
Average precipitation mm (inches)	35 (1.4)	46 (1.8)	63 (2.5)	117 (4.6)	402 (15.8)	400 (15.7)	441 (17.4)	471 (18.5)	440 (17.3)	258 (10.2)	94 (3.7)	68 (2.7)	2,835 (111.6)
Average rainy days	9.9	11.1	13.9	18.9	26.0	27.3	28.9	28.5	26.1	19.7	14.5	12.8	237.6
Source: Meteoblue

== Demographics ==
Population census of Banaue
Year	Pop.	±% p.a.
1918	17,013	—
1939	17,127	+0.03%
1948	15,311	−1.24%
1960	17,877	+1.30%
1970	20,268	+1.26%
1975	20,489	+0.22%
1980	22,900	+2.25%
1990	16,943	−2.97%
1995	20,514	+3.65%
2000	20,563	+0.05%
2007	21,448	+0.58%
2010	22,365	+1.54%
2015	21,837	−0.45%
2020	20,652	−1.17%
2024	20,143	−0.60%
Source: Philippine Statistics Authority

In the 2024 census, the population of Banaue was 20,143 people, with a density of 110 inhabitants per square kilometre or 280 inhabitants per square mile.

== Economy ==
Poverty incidence of Banaue (%)

Source: Philippine Statistics Authority

The main source of economy in Banaue is agriculture. Banaue undergoes rice cultivation and conservation farming as sources of agriculture. Banaue manufactures local crafts by woodcarving, traditional weaving, and basketry.

== Government ==
=== Local government ===
Banaue, belonging to the lone congressional district of the province of Ifugao, is governed by a mayor designated as its local chief executive and by a municipal council as its legislative body in accordance with the Local Government Code. The mayor, vice mayor, and the councilors are elected directly by the people through an election which is being held every three years.

=== Elected officials ===
Members of the Municipal Council (2025–2028)
Position	Name
Congressman	Solomon R. Chungalao
Mayor	Donald L. Mongolnon
Vice-Mayor	Kendall Pung-ao T. Immoliap
Councilors	Rogelio N. Immatong
Councilors	Karen Joy B. Luglug
Councilors	Albert B. Magguling Sr.
Councilors	Roberto M. Immotna
Councilors	Fermin P. Haclao Jr.
Councilors	Julius B. Tayaban
Councilors	Wilson A. Balungay
Councilors	Romando G. Mannod

== Ifugao Rice Terraces ==
Sometimes called by locals as the "Eighth Wonder of the World", the Ifugao Rice Terraces begin at the base of the mountain range and extend several thousand feet upwards. Two of the terrace clusters in Banaue, namely Bangaan and Batad, are part of the UNESCO World Heritage inscription. It is said that their length, if put end to end, would encircle half of the globe. The terraces are believed by many to be more than 2,000 years old as postulated by early Philippine anthropologist Otley Beyer, recent studies by carbon dating however contends this and instead the structures may be less than 1,000 years old. The rice terraces manifest the engineering skill and ingenuity of the sturdy Ifugaos. They are irrigated by means of mountain streams and springs that have been tapped and channelled into canals that run downhill through the rice terraces.

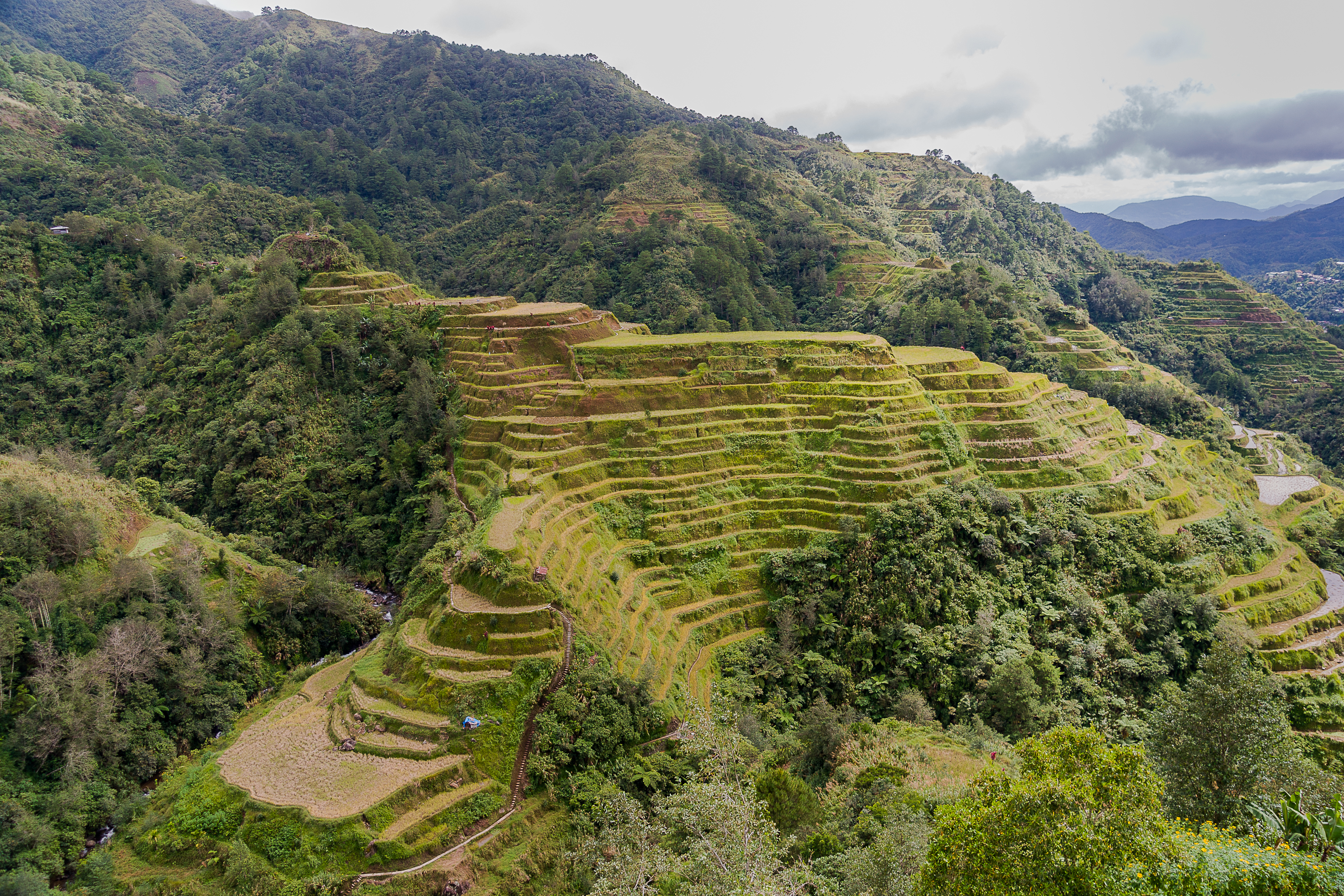
Banaue Rice Terraces

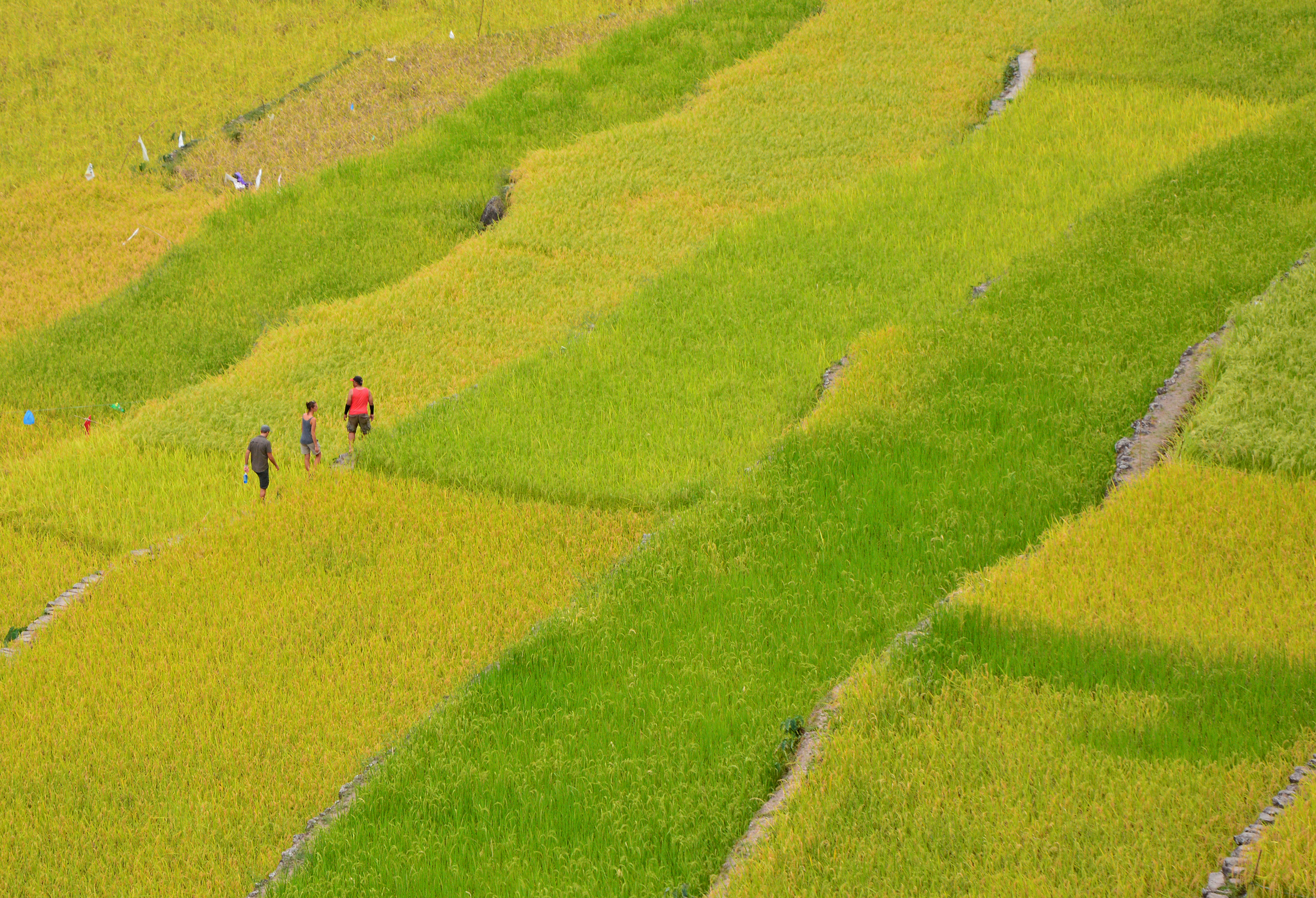
Batad Rice Terraces paddy fields

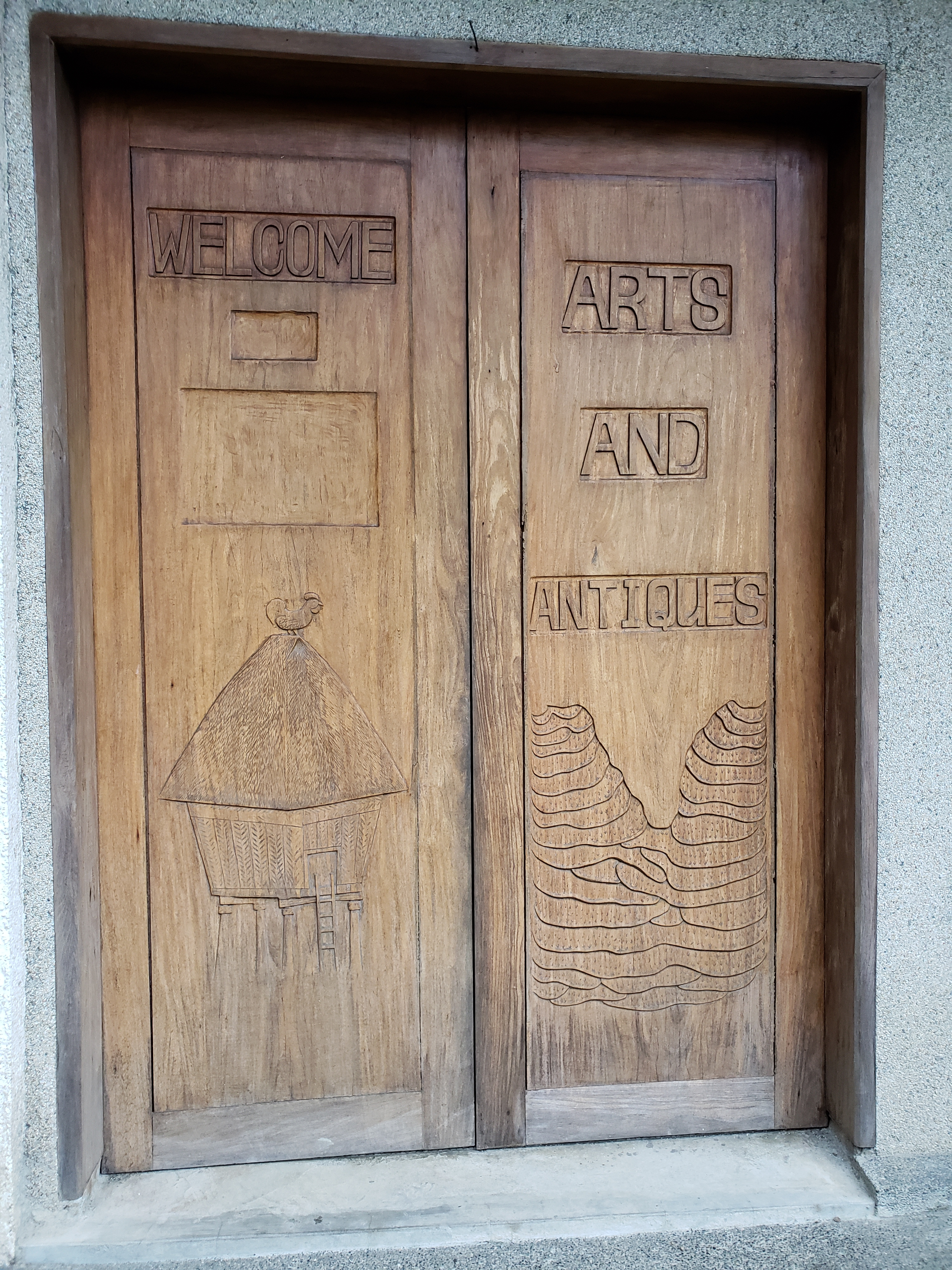
Banaue Museum, which includes artifacts collected by H. Otley Beyer

The rice terraces once stretched north-east to Cagayan and as far south as Quezon. However they are now slowly being abandoned and showing signs of deterioration. The 1990 Luzon earthquake damaged some of the terraces' irrigation systems, while El Niño triggered droughts that led giant earthworms to erode the terraces' soil. Furthermore, the rice variety most suited to the area's cool climate is not a high-yielding crop; because it takes so long to mature, some Ifugao families have abandoned their land in the rice terraces in favour of land that reaps faster rewards.

An Ifugao Terraces Commission was created in 1994 and was superseded by the Banaue Rice Terraces task force, which was closed in 2002.

UNESCO has listed the Batad Rice Terraces and Bangaan Rice Terraces as a World Heritage Site since 1995, under the designation, Rice Terraces of the Philippine Cordilleras.

All located in the Ifugao region, the Rice Terraces also feature as one of the Globally Important Agricultural Heritage Systems or GIAHS. They are supported by indigenous knowledge management of muyong, a private forest that caps each terrace cluster. The muyong is managed through a collective effort and under traditional tribal practices. The communally managed forestry area on top of the terraces contains about 264 indigenous plant species, mostly endemic to the region. The terraces form unique clusters of microwatersheds and are part of the whole mountain ecology. They serve as a rainwater filtration system and are saturated with irrigation water all year round. A biorhythm technology, in which cultural activities are harmonised with the rhythm of climate and hydrology management, has enabled farmers to grow rice at over 1 000 metres.

Contrary to popular notion, the Banaue Rice Terraces as seen from the viewpoint are not included in the UNESCO inscription, due to the presence of numerous modern structures. However, it is a National Cultural Treasure under the Ifugao Rice Terraces.

The stone walled rice terraces were built by means of early tools and methods in order to maximise the use of land space, They exceed the height of the world's tallest building if the vertical distance between top and bottom row are measured.

== Education ==
The Banaue Schools District Office governs all educational institutions within the municipality. It oversees the management and operations of all private and public, from primary to secondary schools.

=== Primary and elementary schools ===
- Amganad Elementary School
- Anaba Elementary School
- Balawis Elementary School
- Banao Elementary School
- Banaue Central School
- Bocos Elementary School
- Bangaan Elementary School
- Batad Elementary School
- Batad Elementary School - Patpat PS Annex
- Cambulo Elementary School
- Cambulo Elementary School - Mattao Annex
- Chunak Primary School
- Ducligan Elementary School
- Ducligan Elementary School - Guitte PS Annex
- Gohang Elementary School
- Good News Christian Academy of Ifugao
- Kinakin Elementary School
- Kinakin Elementary School - Annex
- Patilong Elementary School
- Poitan Elementary School
- Precious Ones Learning Center of Banaue
- Pula Elementary School
- San Fernando Elementary School
- Tam-an Elementary School
- Uhaj Elementary School

=== Secondary schools ===
- Banaue National High School
- Banaue National High School Annex
- Gohang National High School
- Immaculate Conception School

== See also ==
- Banaue Rice Terraces
