= Athylia gressitti =

Scientific classification
- Kingdom: Animalia
- Phylum: Arthropoda
- Class: Insecta
- Order: Coleoptera
- Suborder: Polyphaga
- Infraorder: Cucujiformia
- Family: Cerambycidae
- Genus: Athylia
- Species: A. gressitti

Binomial name
- Athylia gressitti (Gilmour, 1948)

Species of beetle

Athylia gressitti is a species of beetle in the family Cerambycidae. It was described by Gilmour in 1948.
