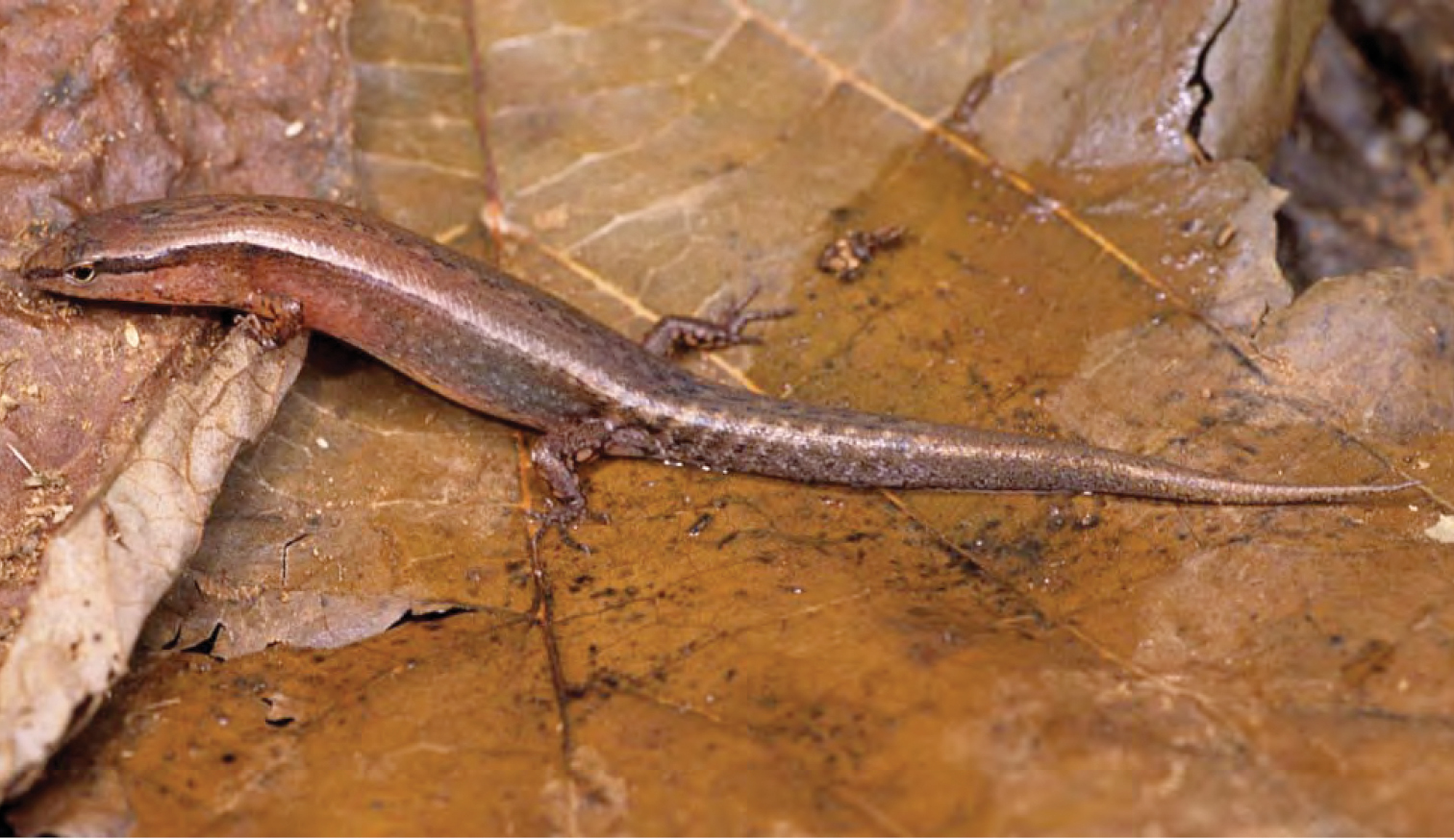

Conservation status
- Least Concern (IUCN 3.1)

Scientific classification
- Kingdom: Animalia
- Phylum: Chordata
- Class: Reptilia
- Order: Squamata
- Suborder: Scinciformata
- Infraorder: Scincomorpha
- Family: Sphenomorphidae
- Genus: Parvoscincus
- Species: P. decipiens

Binomial name
- Parvoscincus decipiens (Boulenger, 1895)

= Parvoscincus decipiens =

Species of lizard

The black-sided sphenomorphus (Parvoscincus decipiens) is a species of skink found in the Philippines.
