= Parvoscincus palaliensis =

Scientific classification
- Kingdom: Animalia
- Phylum: Chordata
- Class: Reptilia
- Order: Squamata
- Family: Scincidae
- Genus: Parvoscincus
- Species: P. palaliensis

Binomial name
- Parvoscincus palaliensis Linkem & Brown, 2013

Species of lizard

Parvoscincus palaliensis is a species of skink found in the Philippines.
