= Athylia nobilis =

Scientific classification
- Kingdom: Animalia
- Phylum: Arthropoda
- Class: Insecta
- Order: Coleoptera
- Suborder: Polyphaga
- Infraorder: Cucujiformia
- Family: Cerambycidae
- Genus: Athylia
- Species: A. nobilis

Binomial name
- Athylia nobilis Breuning, 1960

Species of beetle

Athylia nobilis is a species of beetle in the family Cerambycidae. It was described by Breuning in 1960.
