= Athylia pulcherrima =

Scientific classification
- Kingdom: Animalia
- Phylum: Arthropoda
- Class: Insecta
- Order: Coleoptera
- Suborder: Polyphaga
- Infraorder: Cucujiformia
- Family: Cerambycidae
- Genus: Athylia
- Species: A. pulcherrima

Binomial name
- Athylia pulcherrima (Breuning, 1937)

Synonyms
- Enispia pulcherrima Breuning, 1937

Species of beetle

Athylia pulcherrima is a species of beetle in the family Cerambycidae. It was described by Stephan von Breuning in 1938.
