= Parvoscincus sisoni =

Conservation status
- Vulnerable (IUCN 3.1)

Scientific classification
- Kingdom: Animalia
- Phylum: Chordata
- Class: Reptilia
- Order: Squamata
- Family: Scincidae
- Genus: Parvoscincus
- Species: P. sisoni

Binomial name
- Parvoscincus sisoni Ferner, Brown, & Greer, 1997
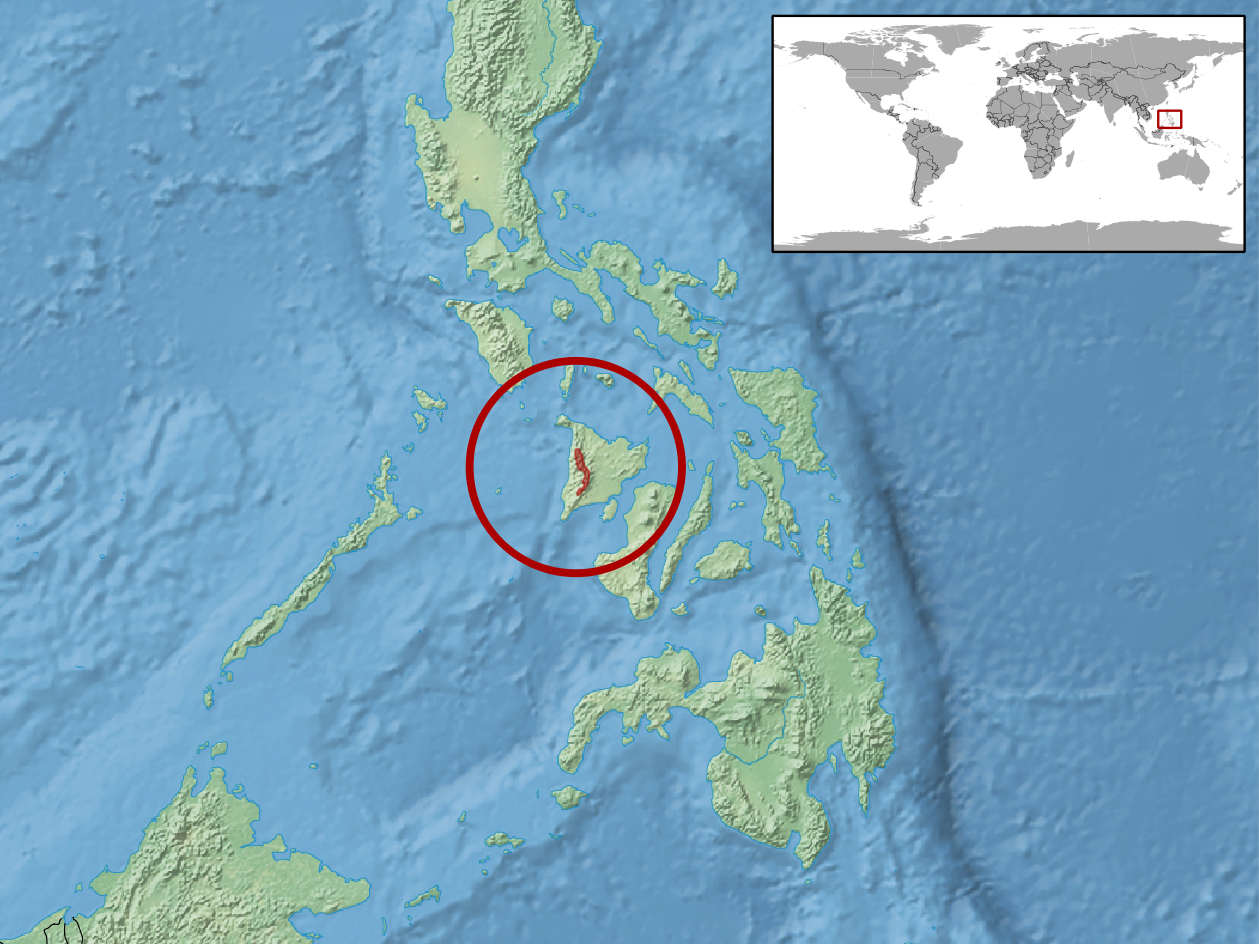

Species of lizard

Parvoscincus sisoni is a species of skink found in the Philippines.
