= Parvoscincus hadros =

Scientific classification
- Kingdom: Animalia
- Phylum: Chordata
- Class: Reptilia
- Order: Squamata
- Family: Scincidae
- Genus: Parvoscincus
- Species: P. hadros

Binomial name
- Parvoscincus hadros (Brown, Linkem, Diesmos, Balete, Duya, & Ferner, 2010)

Species of lizard

The Aurora mountain skink (Parvoscincus hadros) is a species of skink found in the Philippines.
