= Parvoscincus steerei =

Conservation status
- Least Concern (IUCN 3.1)

Scientific classification
- Kingdom: Animalia
- Phylum: Chordata
- Class: Reptilia
- Order: Squamata
- Suborder: Scinciformata
- Infraorder: Scincomorpha
- Family: Sphenomorphidae
- Genus: Parvoscincus
- Species: P. steerei

Binomial name
- Parvoscincus steerei (Stejneger, 1908)

Species of lizard

Steere's sphenomorphus (Parvoscincus steerei) is a species of skink found in the Philippines.
