= H. Otley Beyer =

American anthropologist (1883–1966)

Henry Otley Beyer
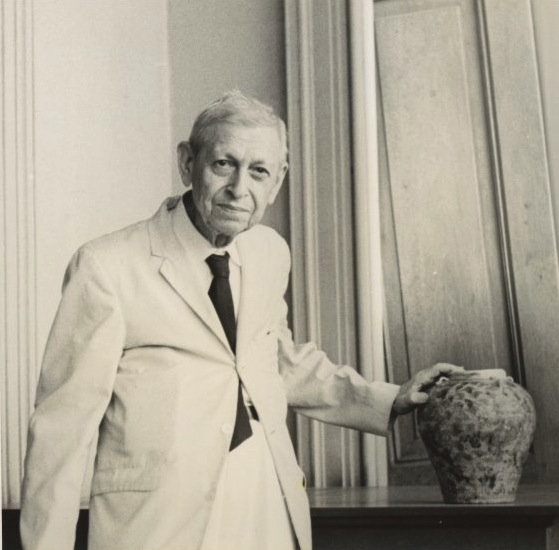
- Born: Henry Otley Beyer; July 13, 1883; Edgewood, Iowa, U.S.
- Died: December 31, 1966 (aged 83); Manila, Philippines
- Education: University of Denver (BA, MA); Harvard University (PhD)
- Occupation: Anthropologist
- Known for: Founding member of the Anthropology department at the University of the Philippines in 1914. Department head from 1925 until retirement in 1954. Known as the Father of Philippine Anthropology.

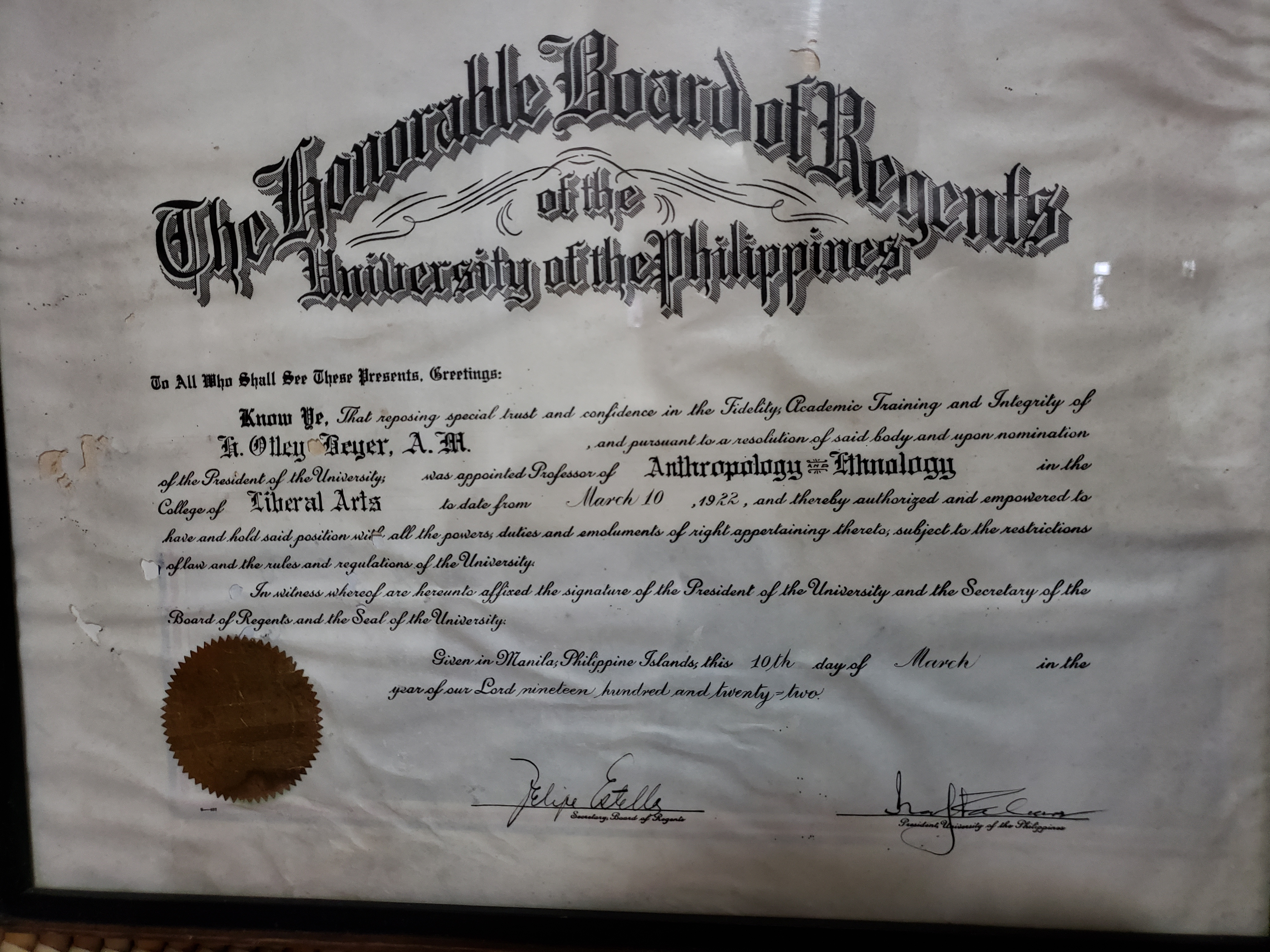
Beyer's appointment as the professor of anthropology and ethnology, University of the Philippines

Henry Otley Beyer (July 13, 1883 – December 31, 1966) was an American anthropologist, who spent most of his adult life in the Philippines teaching Philippine indigenous culture. A.V.H. Hartendorp called Beyer the "Dean of Philippine ethnology, archaeology, and prehistory".

== Biography ==
Beyer was born in Edgewood, Iowa, to a pioneer family of Bavarian origin and developed an interest in the Philippines when he visited the Philippine exhibit at the Louisiana Purchase Centennial Exhibition in St Louis, Missouri, in 1904.

He graduated from University of Denver for both his B.A. and an M.A. in chemistry, after which he volunteered to teach in the Philippines. He pursued postgraduate anthropological studies at Harvard University as a Winthrop scholar.

His first years in the Philippines were spent as a teacher in the Cordillera Mountains on Luzon island, home of the Ifugao people. He later married Lingayu Gambuk, the daughter of an Ifugao village chief of Amganad, Banaue. Their son William, born in 1918, was their only child. Beyer remained a Protestant throughout his life even while living in a predominantly Catholic country.

He was appointed ethnologist in the Philippine Bureau of Science and part-time head of the Philippine Museum. He became sole instructor in anthropology at the University of the Philippines in 1914. In 1925, he became the head of the university's department of anthropology and its first professor.

By that time, the anthropology department and its museum that Beyer himself built occupied the entire second floor of Rizal Hall, which housed the university's College of Liberal Arts until 1949. Beyer remained head of the department until his official retirement from the University of the Philippines in 1954 after 40 years of full-time teaching.

During the Second World War, Beyer was initially allowed to continue his work at Rizal Hall, but he was later interned along with other Americans in the Philippines.

Before his death, the University of the Philippines, Silliman University, and Ateneo de Manila awarded him with honorary doctorates. He also received a number of awards for his 60 years of scholarship in the Philippines. In 1965, the University of the Philippines held an H. Otley Beyer Symposium in his honor. The proceedings of the symposium were published two years later.

He died in 1966.

== Legacy ==
The National Library of Australia acquired his papers and extensive library in 1972.

A species of Philippine lizard, Parvoscincus beyeri, is named in his honor.

Beyer's work is mentioned in Walter Robb's essay "Man Tracks On Luzon".

== Quotes ==
"Archaeological work is like a fascinating mystery story, with the specimens and site data serving as vital clues - and everything is of most importance while both the specimens and your memory of how and where they were found is still quite fresh, and unconfused by later activities elsewhere."—In a letter to a colleague, March 1955.

Beyer described his work as "trying to serve the University [of the Philippines] and to procure and conserve for the People of the Philippines the evidence of their abundant ancient culture."—In a letter to Carlos P. Romulo, then president of the University of the Philippines.
