= Parvoscincus tagapayo =

Conservation status
- Near Threatened (IUCN 3.1)

Scientific classification
- Kingdom: Animalia
- Phylum: Chordata
- Class: Reptilia
- Order: Squamata
- Family: Scincidae
- Genus: Parvoscincus
- Species: P. tagapayo

Binomial name
- Parvoscincus tagapayo (R.M. Brown, McGuire, Ferner & Alcala, 1999)

Synonyms
- Sphenomorphus tagapayo R.M. Brown, McGuire, Ferner & Alcala, 1999; Parvoscincus tagapayo — Linkem, A. Diesmos & R.M. Brown, 2011

Species of lizard

Parvoscincus tagapayo, the Aurora mountain skink, is a species of lizard in the family Scincidae. The species is endemic to the Philippines.

== Etymology ==
The specific name, tagapayo, is a Tagalog word meaning "wise entrusted friend, advisor, or mentor", referring to American herpetologist Walter Creighton Brown, in whose honor this species is named.

== Geographic range ==
P. tagapayo is found on the island of Luzon, Philippines.

== Habitat ==
The preferred natural habitat of P. tagapayo is forest, at altitudes of 400–1,000 m (1,300–3,300 ft).

== Reproduction ==
The mode of reproduction of P. tagapayo is unknown.
