= Mount Banahaw =

Active volcano in the Philippines

- Banahao
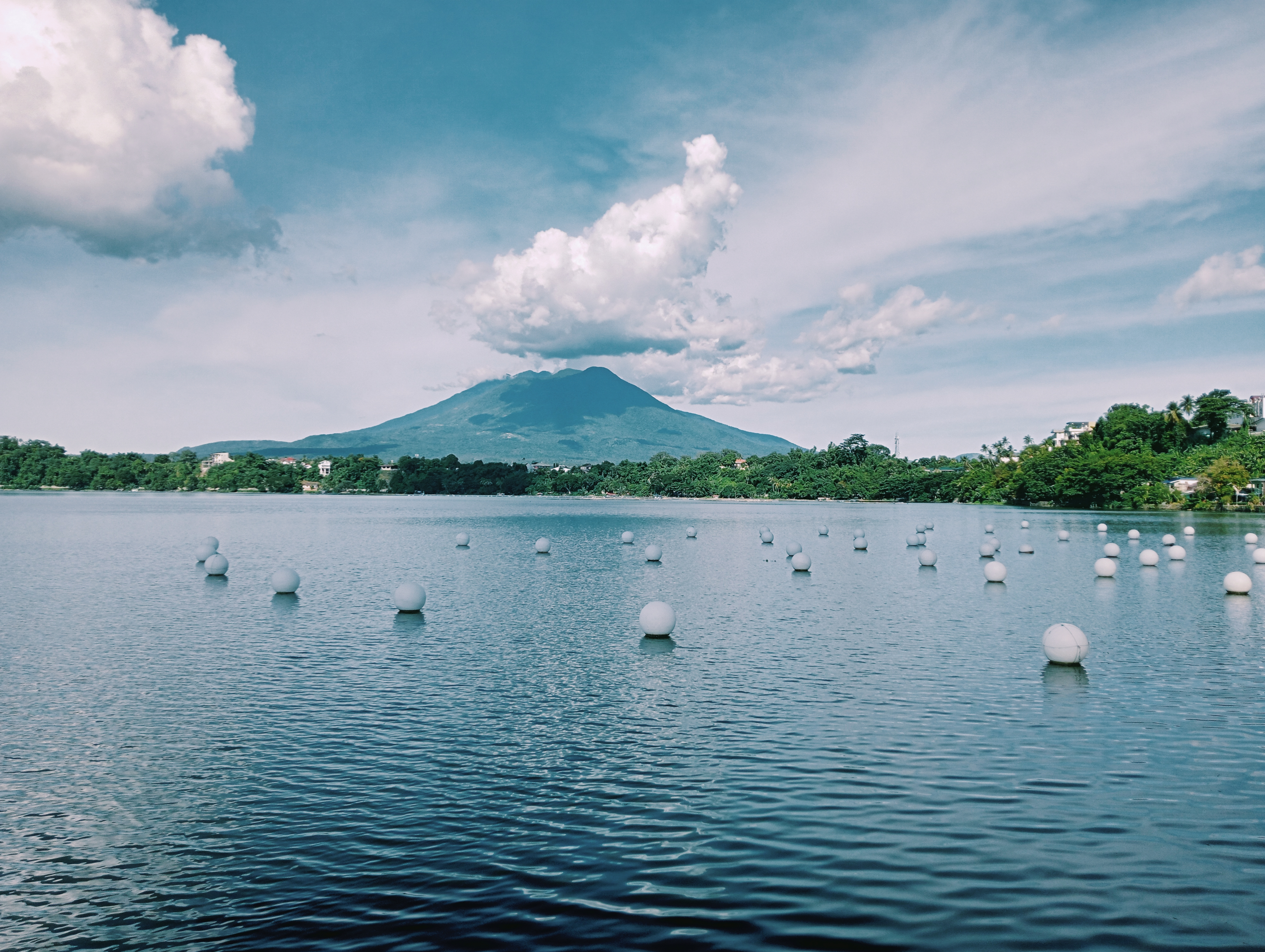
- Mount Banahaw, seen from Sampaloc Lake in San Pablo, Laguna

Highest point
- Elevation: 2,170 m (7,120 ft)
- Prominence: 1,919 m (6,296 ft)
- Listing: Active volcano; Ultra; Ribu
- Coordinates: 14°04′03″N 121°29′33″E

Geography
- Location within Luzon Location within Philippines
- Country: Philippines
- Region: Calabarzon
- Province: Laguna; Quezon
- Cities and municipalities: Candelaria; Dolores; Liliw; Lucban; Majayjay; Nagcarlan; Rizal; San Pablo; Sariaya; Tayabas
- Topo map(s): Mount Banahaw Relief Map, SRTM-1.jpg

Geology
- Mountain type: Stratovolcano complex
- Volcanic zone: Macolod Corridor
- Volcanic arc: Luzon Volcanic Arc
- Last eruption: Unknown

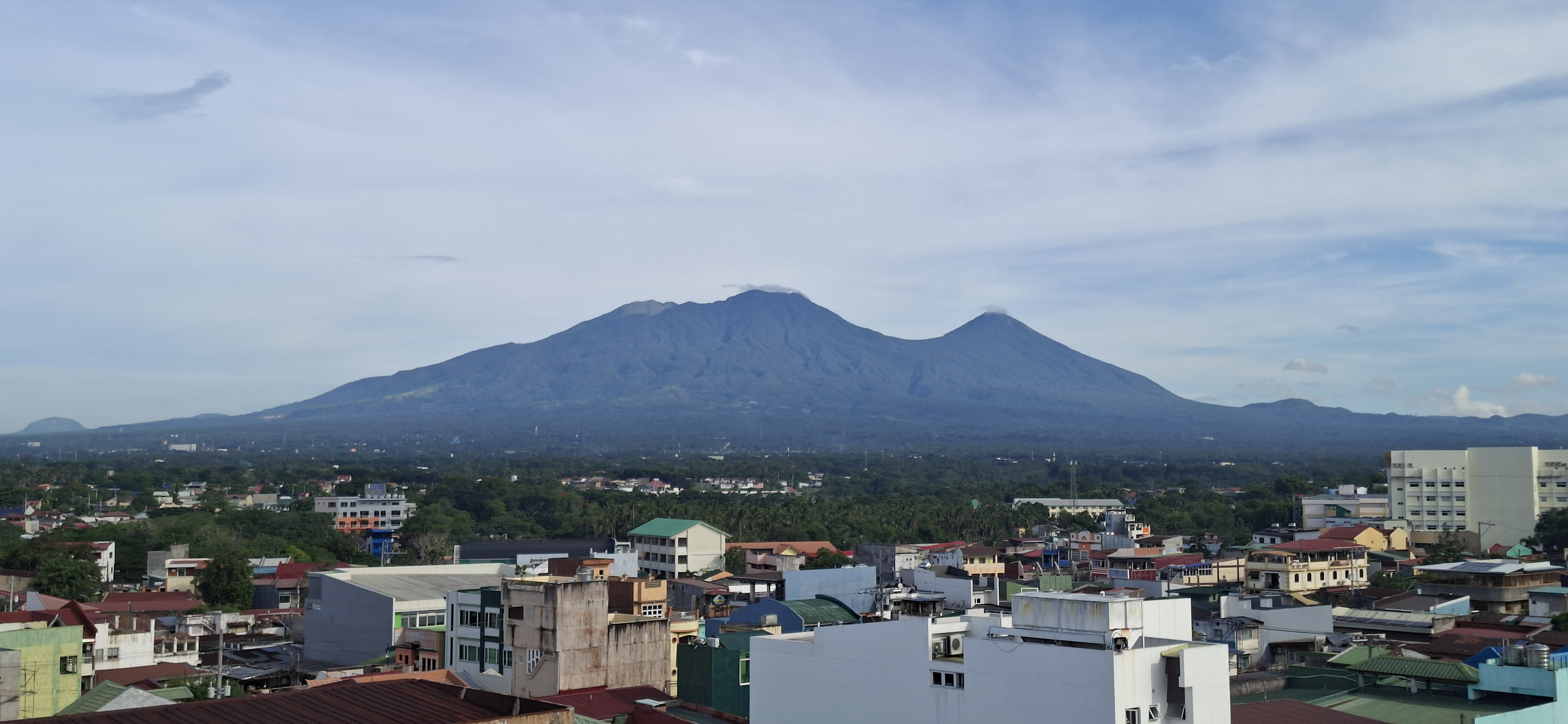
Mount Banahaw (left), Mount Banahaw de Lucban (right), and Mount Masalukot (far left), as seen from Lucena, Quezon Province

Mount Banahaw (IPA: [bɐˈnahaʊ]; also spelled as Banahao and Banájao) is an active complex volcano on Luzon in the Philippines. The three-peaked volcano is located at the boundary of Laguna and Quezon provinces. It is the highest mountain in both provinces and Calabarzon region, dominating the landscape for miles around.

The mountain is considered by many a holy mountain, thus a bundok dambana, and is popular among pilgrims along with mountain climbers. It is located in a protected area known as Mounts Banahaw–San Cristobal Protected Landscape covering 10,901 hectares (26,940 acres) of land.

== Physical characteristics ==
The andesitic Banahaw volcanic complex is composed of several stratovolcanoes with Mount Banahaw, the largest with a maximum elevation of 2,170 meters (7,119 ft) above mean sea level. The summit is topped by a 1.5-by-3.5-kilometer (0.93 mi × 2.17 mi) and 210-meter-deep (690 ft) caldera that is breached on the southern rim believed to have been caused by the 1730 eruption. Prior to 1730, a lake occupied the summit crater of Mount Banahaw. The resulting Mudflow destroyed the town of Sariaya, Quezon located below the mountain.

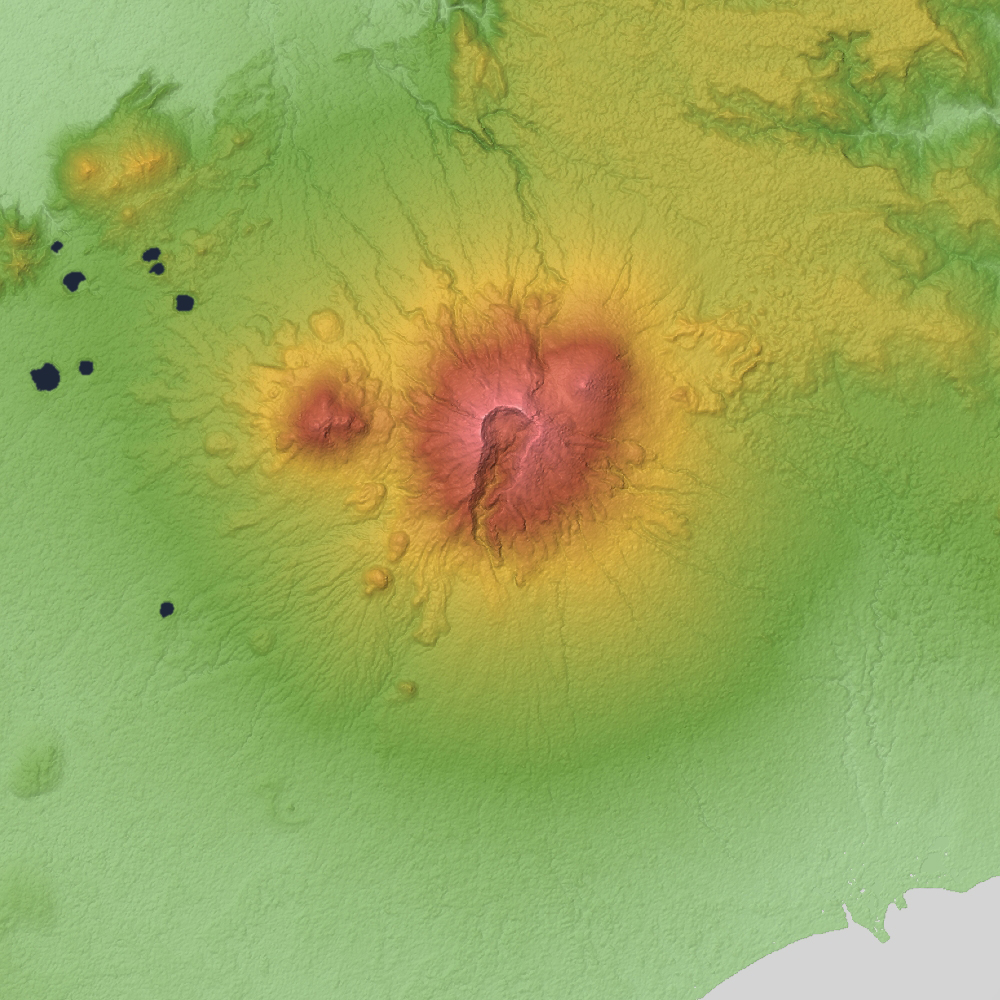
Relief map

- Other peaks:

- Mount San Cristobal (on the western slope)
- Mount Banahaw de Lucban (at northeastern slope)
- Buho Masalukot Domes (at southwestern slope)
- Mount Mayabobo

- Maars: Lake Dagatan/Gunao Lake and Lake Ticob
- Thermal Areas:

- Tiaong-San Pablo hot/warm springs
- Bakia warm/cold springs
- Sampaloc warm springs
- Mainit hot/warm springs
- Cagsiay hot/warm springs

== Importance to locals ==
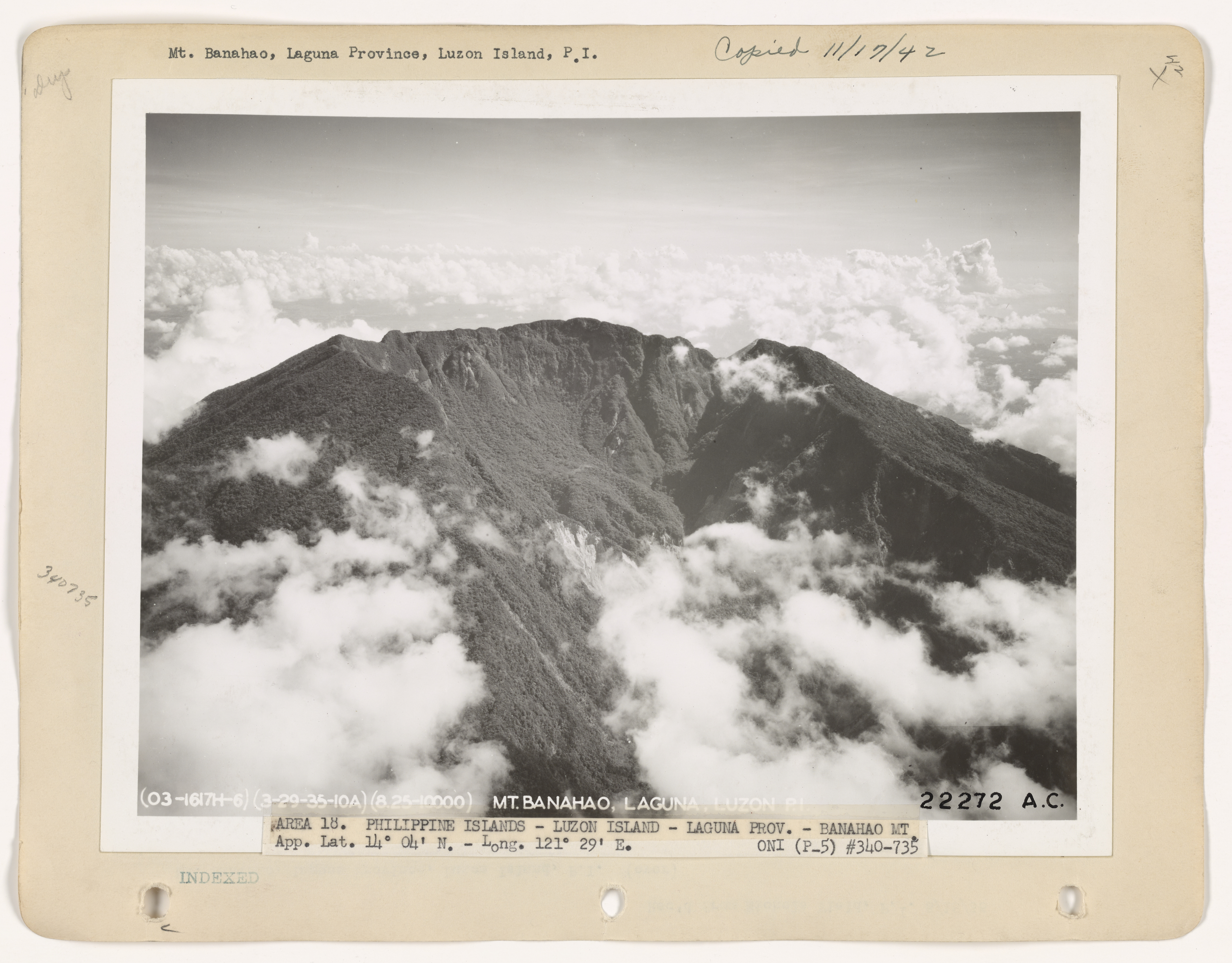
Aerial view of Banahaw summit, circa 1940s

Banahaw is a custom pilgrimage site for locals, believed by many as a holy mountain, a spiritually-charged location. The mountain and its environs are considered sacred by local residents; the water from its sacred springs are deemed "holy water" for allegedly having beneficial qualities, issuing forth from locations called "puestos" or "holy sites". These sites are unique natural features composed not only of springs, but also caves, streams and boulders; with names with biblical allusions, and shrines erected in, on or around them. These locations were allegedly revealed to a man named Agripino Lontoc by the "Santong Boses" or the "Holy Voices", which also gave the names to these places way back during the Spanish colonial era. Another one of these mountains is the adjacent Mount Banahaw de Lucbán.

Banahaw is also a part of the Makiling-Banahaw Watershed, a reservation of the National Power Corporation (NAPOCOR) providing steam for power generation, as well as water source for domestic and industrial uses.

== Hiking ==
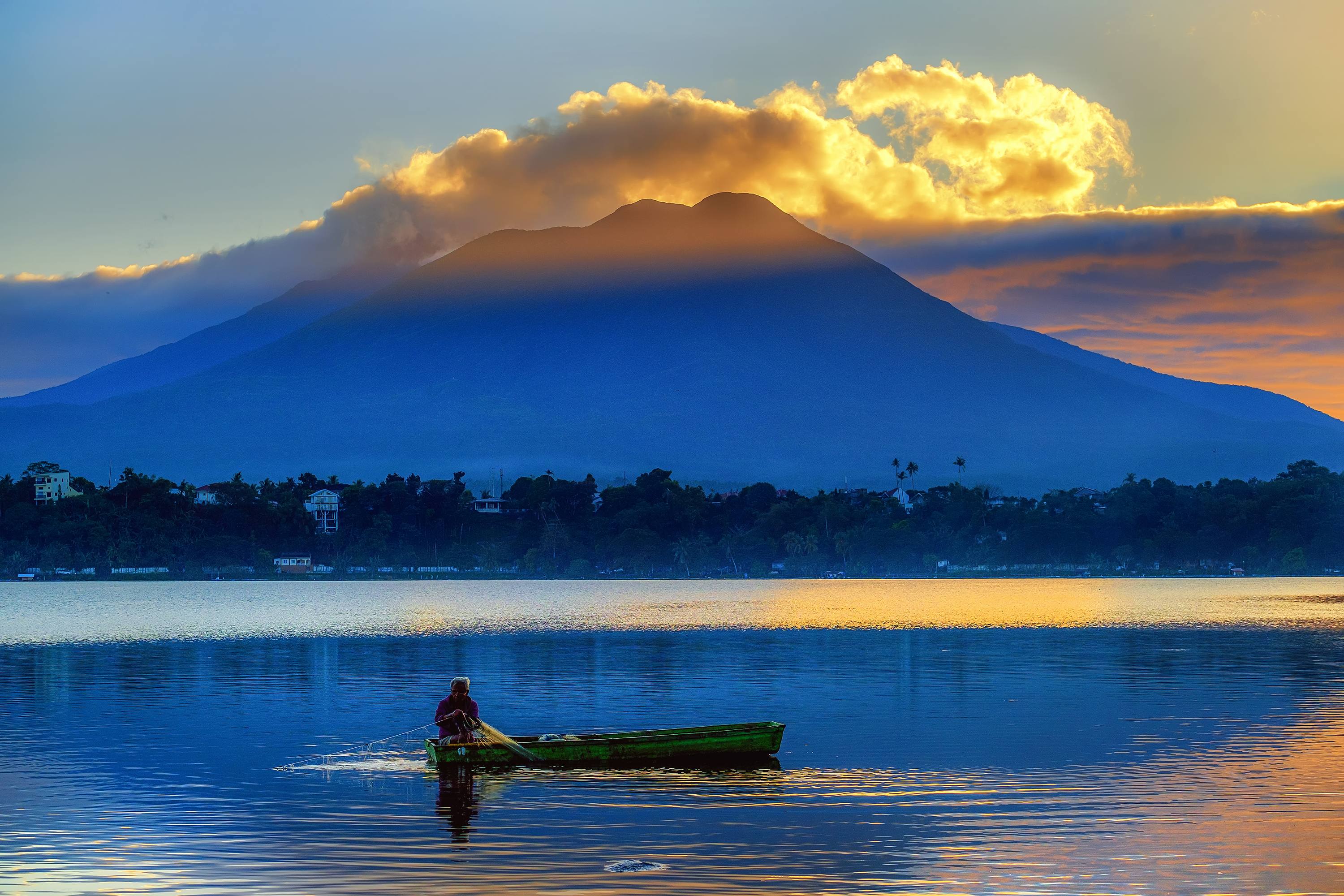
Mount Banahaw and scenic Lake Sampaloc in San Pablo, Laguna

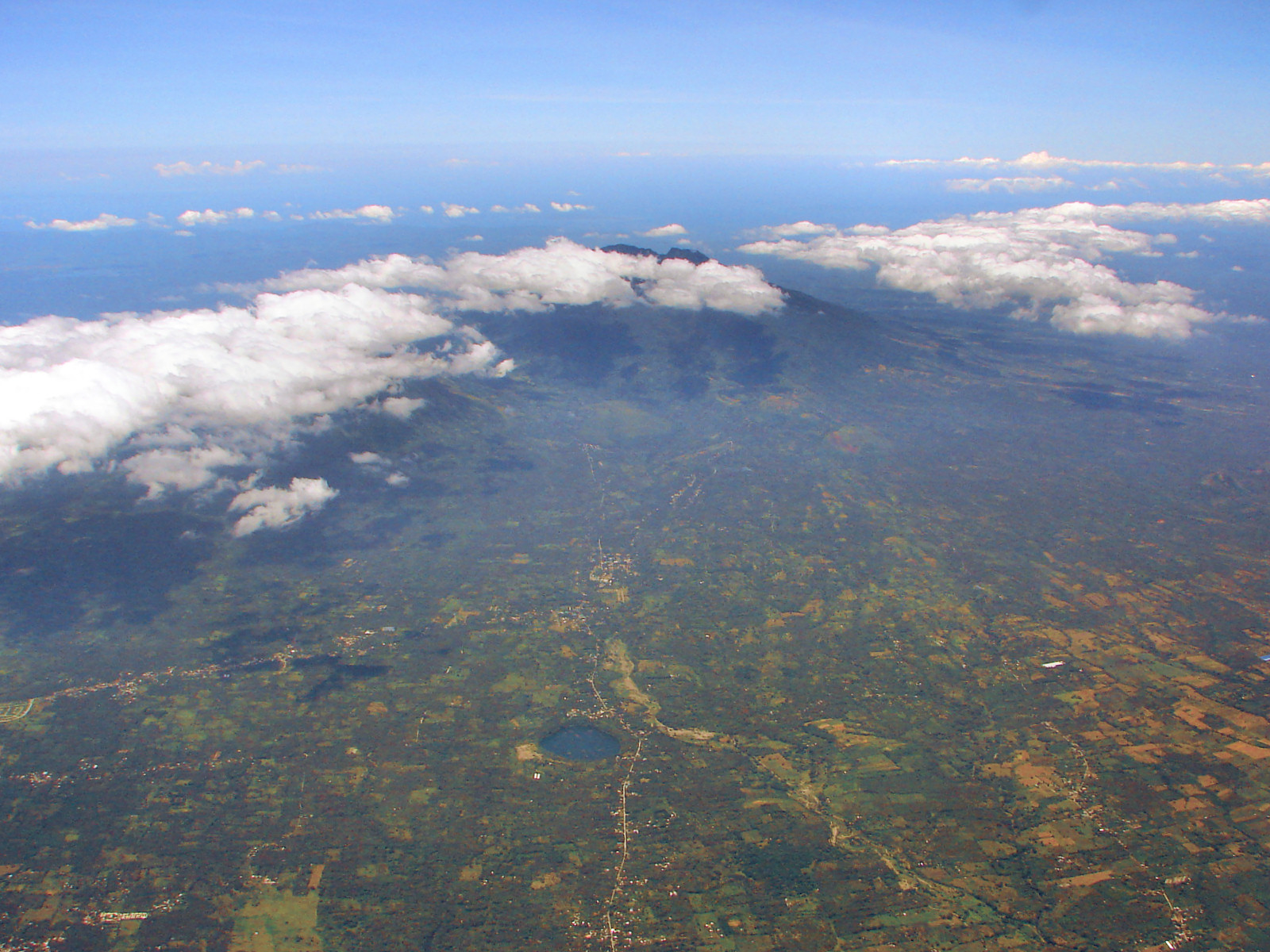
Aerial view of Mt. Banahaw from the south-west

The mountain is popular not only with pilgrims but also among mountain climbers being the closest over 2,000-meter (6,600 ft) mountain from Manila. Before 2004, hiking activity peaked during Holy Week each year, with climbers numbering in the thousands. At least four trails exist from Dolores, Sariaya, and other towns of Quezon located on its foothills. The most frequently used trails are the Cristalino and Tatlong Tangke, taking an average of 9 and 5 hours, respectively. These two trails originate from Barangay Kinabuhayan in Dolores, and meet near the summit, which is actually the rim of the Banahaw caldera. On the summit are viewpoints, labeled as Durungawan I, II, and III, which are the usual destination for pilgrims and hikers. Other points of interest include the "Kuweba ng Diyos Ama" (Tagalog: Cave of God the Father) and the spring at Brgy. Kinabuhayan, said to have curative powers.

=== Pollution ===
Due to incessant climbing activity the mountain trails have become littered with trash. In March 2004, the Department of Environment and Natural Resources ordered a 5-year suspension of hiking activity in the mountains, covering the Dolores and Sariaya trails. Reopening was delayed was then scheduled to March 2012, but was further extended to February 2015. Some sections of the mountain were reopened to hikers in 2019, and the mountain observed seasonal openings due to the mountain's religious significance, but most sections of the mountain still remain closed.

== Biodiversity ==
Frogs endemic to Mount Banahaw include Platymantis banahao, Platymantis indeprensus, Platymantis montanus, Platymantis naomii, and Platymantis pseudodorsalis.

=== Reptiles ===
The Banahao forest skink (Parvoscincus banahaoensis) is a species of skink endemic to Mount Banahao.

=== Mammals ===
Mount Banahaw-San Cristobal Protected Landscape is home to four endemic rodents: the Banahaw tree mouse (Musseromys gulantang), the Banahaw tweezer-beaked rat (Rhychomys banaho), the Banahaw forest mouse (Apomys banahao), and the Banahaw lowland forest mouse (Apomys magnus).

== See also ==
- Sacred mountains
- List of volcanoes in the Philippines
  - List of active volcanoes in the Philippines
  - List of potentially active volcanoes in the Philippines
  - List of inactive volcanoes in the Philippines
- List of protected areas of the Philippines
- Philippine Institute of Volcanology and Seismology
- List of ultras of the Philippines
