= Nyayanga =

Nyayanga Archaeological Site
- Interactive map of Nyayanga Archaeological Site
- 0°23′55″S 34°27′7″E
- Type: Lower Paleolithic Archaeological Site
- Periods: ~3-2.55 million years ago
- Cultures: Oldowan Tool Industry
- Associated with: Early Hominids
- Location: Homa Peninsula, Kenya
- Region: East Africa

Nyayanga is a Lower Paleolithic period site containing artifacts and fossils dated to 3.032-2.595 million years ago. Nyayanga is one of the oldest Oldowan localities discovered to date, and over 1,776 fossils and 330 artifacts have been recovered from the top half of its NY-1 layer, which roughly dates to 3-2.6 million years ago. Recent excavations include the Homa Peninsula Paleoanthropological Project's excavations from 2016 to 2023 yielding 272 NY-1 layer artifacts and a July 2025 project uncovering tools believed to be older than 2.6 million years.

Oldowan artifacts at Nyayanga have been found in context with Paranthropus teeth as well as bovid and hippopotamid skeletal remains. Furthermore, many of the stones used in the construction of these tools were selectively sourced from over 10 km away. These findings indicate the Oldowan was developed and used over a wider area and that long-distance stone transport began earlier in the line of human evolution than previously thought.

== Stratigraphy, geography and geology ==
=== Stratigraphy ===
The Nyayanga site is divided into four main stratigraphic layers: NY-1, NY-2, NY-3, NY-4 (ordered from deepest to shallowest). The age of these beds is constrained by (U-Th)/He dating of apatite crystals, magnetostratigraphy, lithostratigraphic correlation with the Rawi Fm deposited north of the Homa Mountain, and biostratigraphy, with the apatite crystals indicating layer NY-1 dates to around 2.87-2.98 million years ago .

=== Geology ===
The upper NY-1 deposit consists mainly of clayey silts with rare sandy granule and pebble lens overbank deposits from a westward flowing paleochannel located roughly 40 meters away.

=== Geography ===
Nyayanga is located on the Western shoreline of the Homa Peninsula in Southwestern Kenya. The peninsula is within the east-west-oriented Nyanza Rift, specifically located just South of Winam Gulf of Lake Victoria. The site is dominated by the Homa Mountain carbonatite complex which contains alluvial, fluvial, and lacustrine sediments that date from 6 million years ago through the Holocene (~10 thousand years ago). Sediments at Nyayanga are situated in a 40,000 square meter amphitheater and a 500 m upsloped gully. Stable carbon isotopic analysis of pedogenic carbonates, when taken into account with reconstruction of local diets and bovid fossil frequencies, indicates that hominin activities likely took place in a wooded grassland, bushland, or shrubland along the aforementioned channel and characterized by C_{4} grasses. Additionally, a freshwater spring was a valuable local resource.

== Evidence of Oldowan industry ==
Two recent excavations by Plummer et al., "excavation 3" and "excavation 5" of sections dated to ~2.98 and ~2.87 million years ago, respectively, of Nyayanga layer NY-1 yielded 135 stone artifacts presenting Oldowan features. Additionally, in the same project, 195 artifacts containing similar features were recovered from the surface. These assemblages have core and flake sizes and flake scar frequencies similar to other Oldowan assemblages. Further, it is evident that Nyayanga hominins removed flakes from cores using unifacial, bifacial, and multifacial reduction techniques commonly utilized in Oldowan tool production, and present are cortical flakes and hammerstones with battering damage consistent with on-site flake production through hard hammer percussion. In fact, a considerable portion, 7%, of artifacts show signs of use in percussive activity.

== Faunal butchery and food processing ==
=== Evidence of faunal butchery ===
In excavations 3 and 5, a total of 1176 bones were found in situ with the NY-1 layer. Of bones discovered in excavation 3, 57.1% are hippopotamids and 19.2% are bovids, and of bones discovered in excavation 5, 61.9% are hippopotamids and 22.2% are bovids.

In excavation 3, at least two hippopotamid individuals were recovered. The skeleton of the more complete individual contained 241 bone fragments including a rib fragment exhibiting a deep cutmark with clear evidence of internal striations. Additionally, 42 stone tools were found closely associated with the skeleton, several in contact with hippopotamid bones.

In excavation 5, 39 bones from presumably one hippopotamid individual were discovered spatially associated with 14 artifacts including a flake and split cobble with percussion damage. The anterior tuberosity of the individual's tibia displays four short, parallel cutmarks. A second bone cluster two meters away contains a broken humerus, a flake, a rib fragment, and a manuport. The non-anatomical arrangement of the skeleton in addition to evidence of hominin damage and presence of associated artifacts suggests these bones may have been moved by hominins during a butchering process.

Additionally, a size three bovid scapular spine fragment displaying cut marks was found eroding at approximately the same level as the excavation 5 hippopotamid. Furthermore, additional bones discovered in the NY-1 layer display evidence of cut marks or percussion damage, indicating hominins were consuming both meat and marrow at this site. This finding is further supported by use-wear analysis.

=== Evidence of plant tissue processing ===
Further use-wear analysis on 30 stone tools from the NY-1 layer support hominin professing of faunal remains and plant tissue on site. 17 flaked pieces display macro- and microtraces evident of pounding activities likely used to process soft (tubers, vegetables, fruits) and hard (fibrous tubers, woody parts) pant tissues. Also, macro- and microtraces evident of cutting and scraping are found on six flakes show materials were being cut and pounded on site.

A study employing quantitative and qualitative analysis of 50 artifacts, 26 showing wear traces, as well as reproductive techniques supports use of percussive stone tools (PSTs) in the processing of plant matter. In this study, Caricola et al. created stone tool replicas similar to those found at Nyayanga and used them to process food items with varying physical characteristics, including soft and juicy, pulpy and fibrous, and woody and fibrous. In experimentation, replicas used to process cassava and yams (roots) yielded smooth and flat polish with irregular pits and striations, replicas used to process hazel wood park produced rough and domed polish with short, parallel, and tapering striations, and replicas used to process bone yielded a distinctive polish with deep crystals leveling and furrow striae polished associated. These results were then compared with microscopic use-wear analysis of the 26 Nyayanga artifacts, revealing that the artifacts were used intensively to crush both plant and animal tissue. Specifically, five artifacts showed rough/domed pitted polish, indicating use related to woody plant processing; six artifacts showed smooth/domed and cratered/pitted polish, indicating use in processing pulpy vegetable material and possibly some tubers of white flesh and high starch content; four artifacts showed smooth and flat polish accompanied by deep furrow striae, indicating use in bone processing.

Additionally, three artifacts with highly developed traces indicative of intense use likely were used to process multiple different types of plant consistencies. Generally, there were higher counts of striae in reproductive experiments, possibly due to differences in percussion bases of reproduced and archaeological materials as it is unknown exactly what percussion bases ancient hominins were using at Nyayanga (anvil, ground, etc.). Quantitative analysis of the same artifacts examining six parameters (root mean square (RMS) roughness, max peak height, max valley depth, max height, average max valley depth, average max peak height) indicate most of the studied artifacts were likely used to process softer materials - pulpy plants/underground storage organs - with a few outliers presumably used to process faunal material.

== Stone and tool transport distance ==
=== Subregional geology and geography ===
==== Geology ====
The distribution of raw materials in the Nyayanga area indicates that many of the durable stones used to create Oldowan tools were sourced from over 10 kilometers away. The rock types used in Nyayanga tool making were procured from three primary geological systems in the region: the Homa mountain carbonatite center, the Nyanzian Supergroup, and the Bukoban Supergroup. The Nyayanga site is within, to the northeast, and to the northeast of these systems, respectively. Around Homa mountain, Nyanzian clasts underwent intense metasomatism, resulting in fenetized rocks that are softer and less durable than non-fenetized counterparts. Furthermore, fenetized clasts, carbonite, and limestone are common in the Homa Mountain complex, indicating local rocks were generally less durable in the Nyayanga region. Conversely, more distant (in the Bukoban complex, rocks are not found fenetized and thus were not present during volcanic activity of the Homa Mountain and therefore did not undergo metasomatic alteration as rocks of the other two complexes had.

==== Subregional river systems ====
The Homa Mountain river system has been in place since the Miocene and has transported clasts largely derived from the mountain's carbonite clasts throughout the region. Eastern drainages have transported more durable cobbles containing materials such as Bukoban quartzite, Nyanzian rhyolite, vein quartz, and Oyugis granite towards, but not onto, the Homa peninsula. The elevated topography of the Homa Mountain drainage network prevents these cobbles from being deposited within the Homa peninsula.

=== Raw material selectivity in Nyayanga assemblages ===
When Nyayanga artifact raw materials are taken into account with the frequency distribution of available rock types, high levels of selectivity in hominin tool making emerges. A study analyzing a 401 artifact assemblage found that over 70% of tools were manufactured from nonlocal materials with origin East of the Homa Peninsula. In this sample, 130 artifacts were of Bukoban quartzite, 94 of fenetized Nyanzian rhyolite, 84 of quartz, and 43 of Nyanzian rhyolite. Quartzite material was brought near the peninsula by the aforementioned river systems, but final transport of the materials onto the peninsula is not believed to be due to fluvial processes. The nearest deposit of quartzite relative to Nyayanga is believed to have been at the Oboro locality, 13.06 kilometers away at the distal margins of the Awach Tende basin. Nyanzian rhyolite clasts are readily available 13 kilometers East of Nyayanga. Other materials also reside at least 13 kilometers East of Nyayanga, supporting the notion that Nyayanga hominins were sourcing raw materials for lithic production from distances greater than 10 kilometers.

=== Transport behavior ===
It is possible for stone materials and tools to be transported long distances due to repeated cycles of use and short-distance transport to another use site. This dispersal process results in rocks further from their source displaying a higher level of use (higher reduction, lower mass) than rocks found closer to their source. In the Nyayanga artifact assemblage, non-local artifacts exhibit low levels of reduction intensity and high proportions of cortex (weathered, outer part of the rock), indicating materials were gathered at rock deposits with the intent to use them at distant sites like Nyayanga. This selection is similar to behavior of later hominins at Kanjera South. Hominins at both localities procured nonlocal, durable materials, such as Bukoban quartzite and Nyanzian rhyloite, from deposits many kilometers away. However, Kanjera South is dated at 600,000 years later than Nyayanga. While Nyayanga lithics are not as heavily flaked as those at Kanjera South, these discoveries indicate long term planning in the context of lithic production may have developed earlier in hominins than previously thought.

== Contemporary presence of Paranthropus ==
Two hominin individuals, KNM-NG 77315 and KNM-NG 77316, from bed NY-1 are assigned to Paranthropus based on a complete left (likely second) upper molar and a nearly complete left (likely first) lower molar, respectively. The fossils indicate Nyayanga Paranthropus was megadont and had flat molars of poor shearing capability. These fossils are found in spatial association with Oldowan artifacts and a butchered hippopotamid. Analysis of the teeth indicates diets reliant on C_{4} foods. Furthermore, analysis of molar KNM-NG 77316 shows clear association with artifacts, raising the possibility that Paranthropus created/co-opted the creation of stone tools.

== Significant implications ==
=== Relevance to previous thought ===
Discovery of the Nyayanga artifact assemblages have expanded the range of the earliest Oldowan industries by 1300 kilometers. Furthermore, the discovery of the two Paranthropus fossils expands its range 230 kilometers to Southwestern Kenya. Dating these assemblages, it is possible that the Oldowan industry could be 400,000 years older than previously thought and that the emergence of long-distance, planned stone transport behavior began 600,000 years earlier than previously believed. Additionally, Paranthropus fossils being found in spatial association with Oldowan artifacts and butchered fauna indicate Paranthropus may have played a larger than previously expected role in the development of the Oldowan industry.

=== Nyayanga in recent news ===
A 2023 article published by the British Broadcasting Corporation (BBC) highlighted Nyayanga discoveries supporting an origin of the Oldowan industry earlier than previously thought, contemporary with Paranthropus. An August 2025 issue of the Smithsonian Magazine detailed discoveries indicating that early humans were transporting stone to create tools much, possibly 600,000 years, earlier than expected. An August 2024 issue of Popular Archaeology details the connection between the Kanjera South archaeological site and Nyayanga's importance in pushing back to emergence of the Oldowan industry.
