= Mode I =

Mode I may refer to:

- Oldowan or Mode I, archaeological culture's method of fabricating flint tools
- Mode I crack or opening mode of propagation of a fracture
