= Chopper (archaeology) =

Type of stone tool

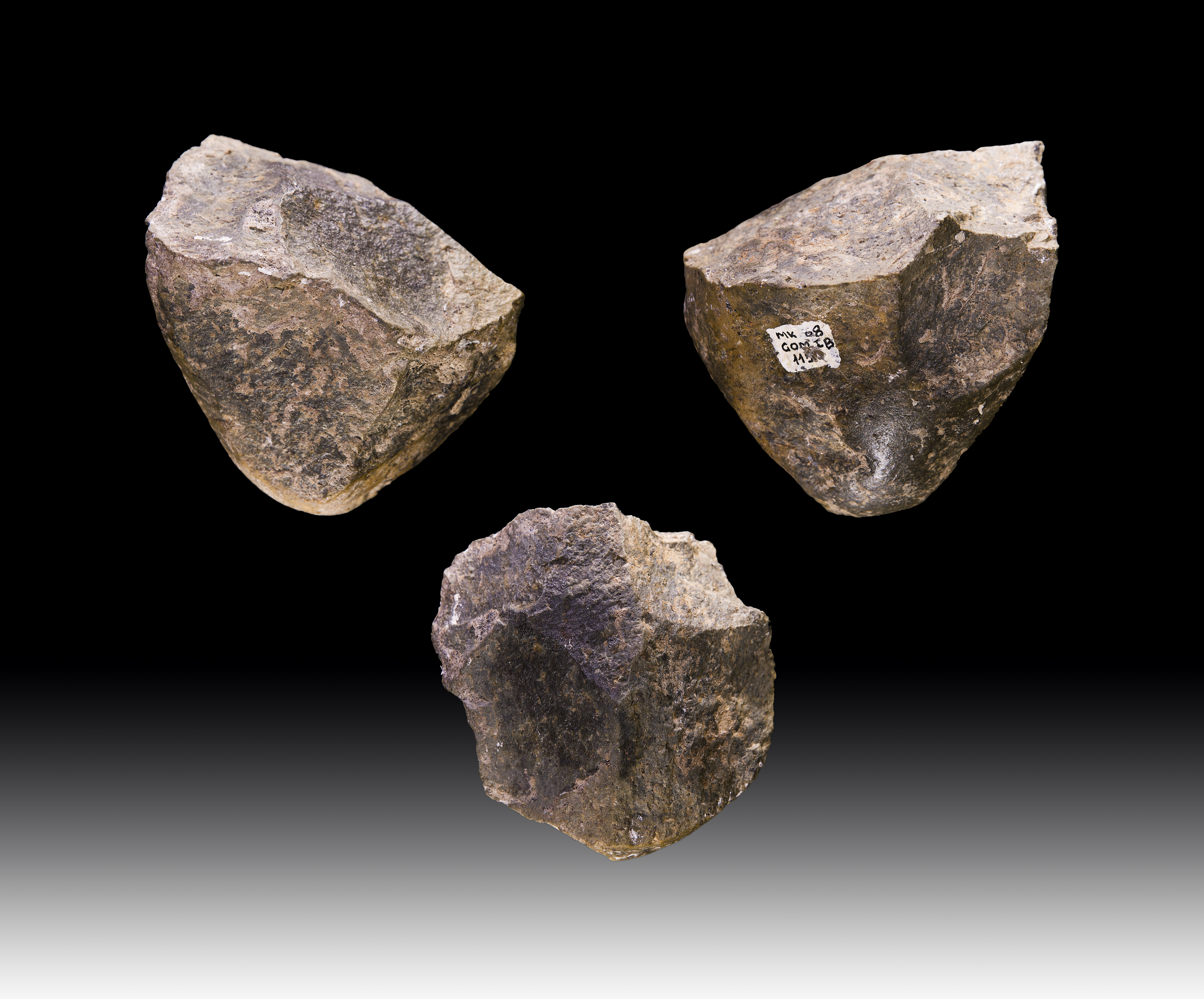
Oldowan-style chopper dating to around 1.7 million years ago from Hadar, Ethiopia

Archaeologists define a chopper as a pebble tool with an irregular cutting edge formed through the removal of flakes from one side of a stone.

Choppers are crude forms of stone tool and are found in industries as early as the Lower Palaeolithic from around 2.5 million years ago. These earliest known specimens were found in the Olduvai Gorge in Tanzania by Louis Leakey in the 1930s. The name Oldowan was given to the tools after the site in which they were excavated. These types of tools were used an estimated time range of 2.5 to 1.2 million years ago.

== Formation ==
To create this tool, one would have to use a hammerstone to chip away flakes on the stone to create a side of the stone with a very sharp edge, allowing for the cutting and hacking of an object. This is a unique type of lithic reduction, as only a single side of the stone is retouched to produce the cutting surface of the stone. The side that does not do the cutting is left unscathed, an unusual practice. These old instruments were made from specific materials. Initially, they were composed of quartz, quartzite, basalt, or obsidian. In the later years of the Oldowan age, two other materials were used: flint and chert. These materials could hold an edge while still being fairly easy to craft into the shape desired. The tool is designed to fit in the palm of the hand, and it is not attached to any other mount that could possibly be used. Known as one of the earliest tools (if not the earliest), its design is a very simple piece of technology, but its performance was very successful in many different scenarios. Seeing the history of these objects and how many cultures used them, it is not a surprise to find them spread throughout the world. A potential stone mass found today could be classified as a chopper if it has a worn edge showing evidence of tool use.

== Locations ==
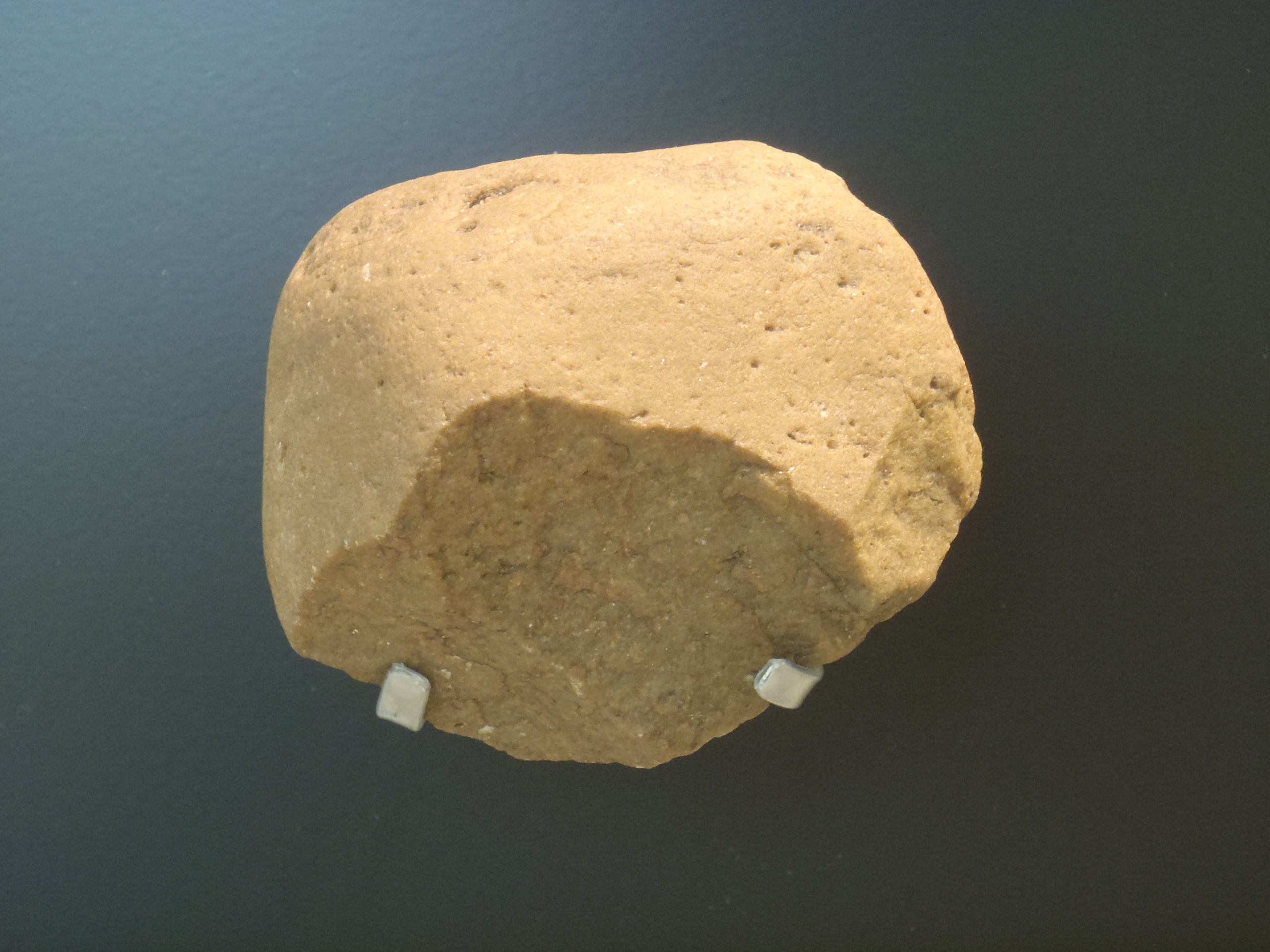
Chopper from Botswana, in Danish National Museum

Choppers are not solely limited to a single area on Earth:

- As mentioned earlier, Africa is known to have supplied the earliest known choppers, specifically known as the Oldowan. Many countries have given sites containing many of these stone tools, including Egypt, Ethiopia, Kenya, Tanzania, and South Africa.
- In North America, similar stone tools have been found in south and southwestern states, such as Oklahoma.
- Europe also has been the home to choppers, with assemblages of stone tools having been found in Europe. Many countries have had Oldowan tools found within them, including Sweden, Portugal, Georgia, Bulgaria, Russia, Spain, Italy, France, Germany, Hungary, the Czech Republic, and the United Kingdom.
- Stone tools, including choppers, dating back to 1.66 million years ago, have been found in Asia. These countries include China, Pakistan, Israel, and Iran.
- A large assemblage of stone lithics were found in Northern Thailand, the Sao Din excavation. Out of the 139 artifacts recovered, many of them fell into the chopper category. These findings helped set Southeast Asian stone technology apart from the classic European Acheulean assemblages.

Although many choppers have been found in each region, this does not mean that the tools found are similarly made. Differences include the shape, length, material used, and other factors. This shows the variation among ancient cultures of the time and how each suited specific needs for each community.

== Usage ==
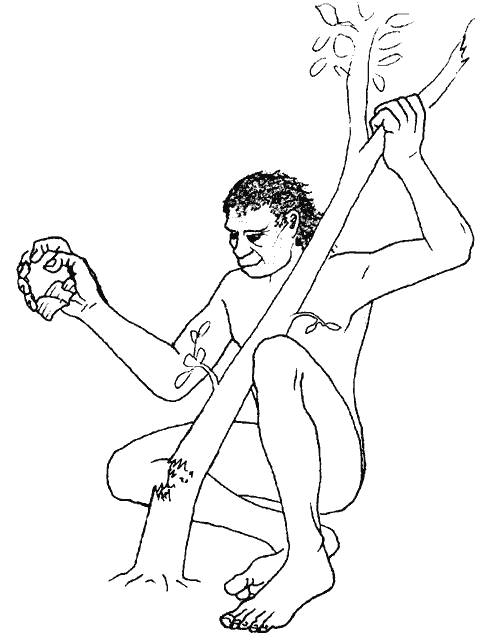
Possible use of a chopper

The ancient peoples that inhabited the earth had many different stone tools to perform various activities. Choppers were used in equal amounts for woodworking, presumably for sharpening spears, and meat processing. However, choppers were used for many different purposes. Used for hacking, cutting, and chopping, choppers allowed early peoples to sever soft materials, especially meat and wood. One of the main uses of choppers was to cut through the meat and skins of hunted animals to obtain food, hide, and fur. The sharpness of the tool improved the overall process. Ridges and cut marks on bones can prove their use for the task. Also, these tools were used on plants, such as digging up roots and shaving and chopping wood.

== Advancement over time ==
Later in history, it seems that choppers were being rendered obsolete by newer technology. The handheld tools for scraping and cutting were no longer sought after, for tools with shapes that fit the hand seemed to be the upcoming trend. Starting about 1.6 million years ago, this new technology evolution emerged, known as the Acheulean tradition. Tools classified under this category are known as the earliest indicators of hand axe usage. The biggest difference from the early Oldowan tools, or choppers, is the fact that two sides have had flakes chipped off, versus the single side of the chopper.

== Early ideas ==
Initial theories proposed by G. Isaac (1970s) that choppers were used for hunting and butchering. However, the size of the choppers did not suggest that it could be powerful enough to actually kill animals like the hippopotamus. L. Binford then proposed that animals were killed by carnivores and Homo was just a scavenger. This theory was tested by P. Shipman and R. Potts. Since the cut marked bones were tooth marked and there were no carcasses or disarticulation of any leftovers, the evidence pointed at the idea of Homo being a scavenger.

== See also ==
- Oldowan
- Hand Axe
