= Complex volcano =

Landform of more than one related volcanic centre

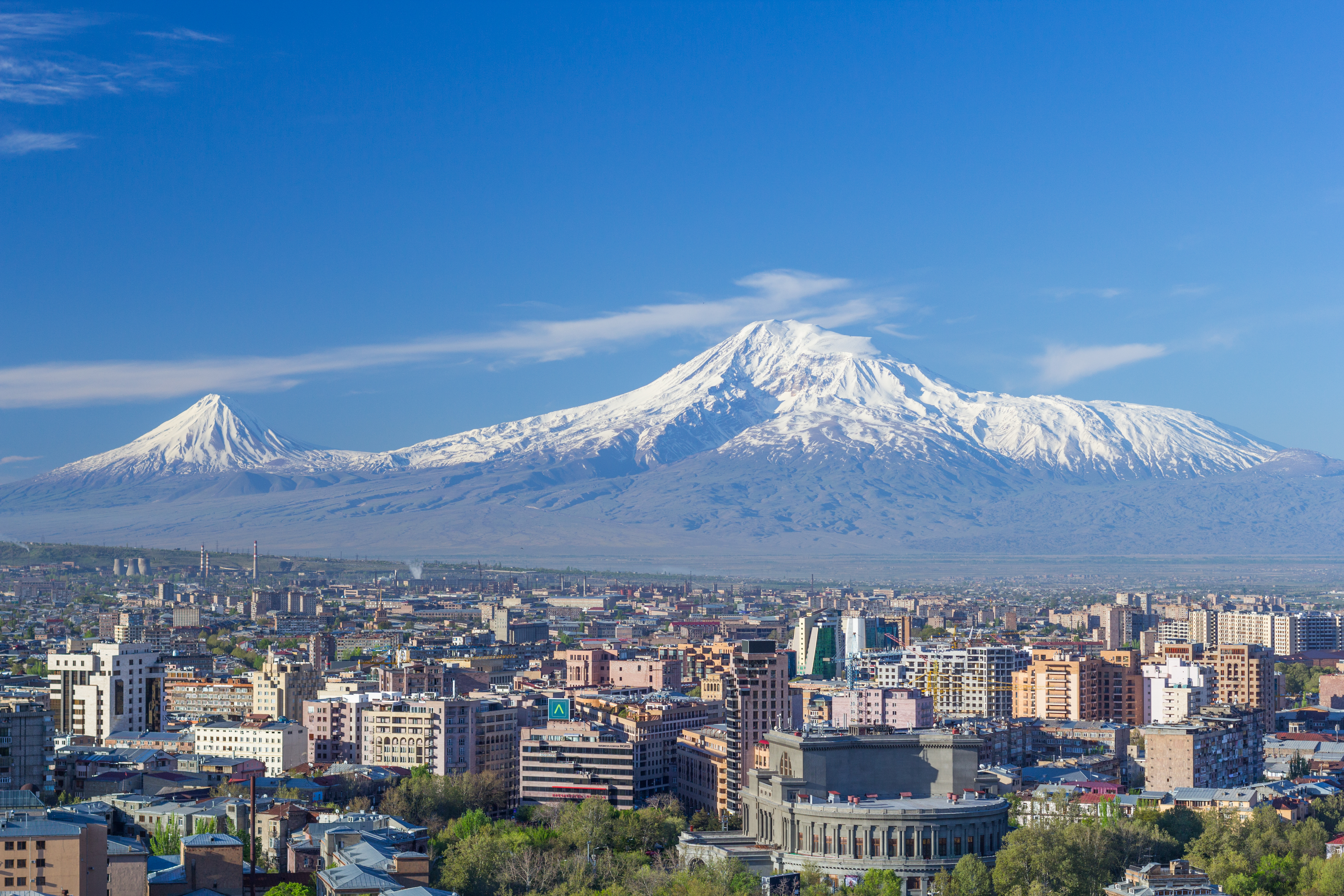
Mount Ararat, Turkey

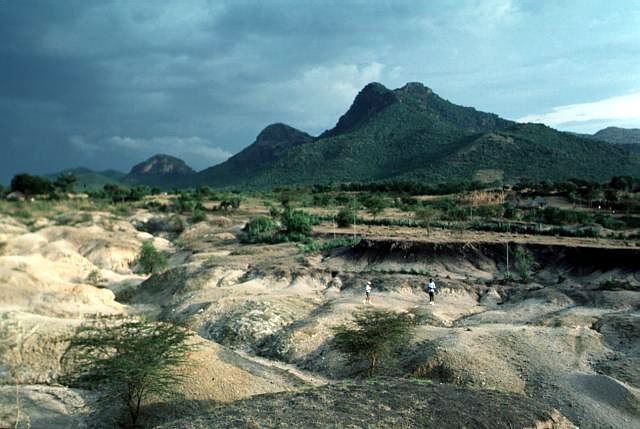
Homa Mountain, Kenya, in 1994

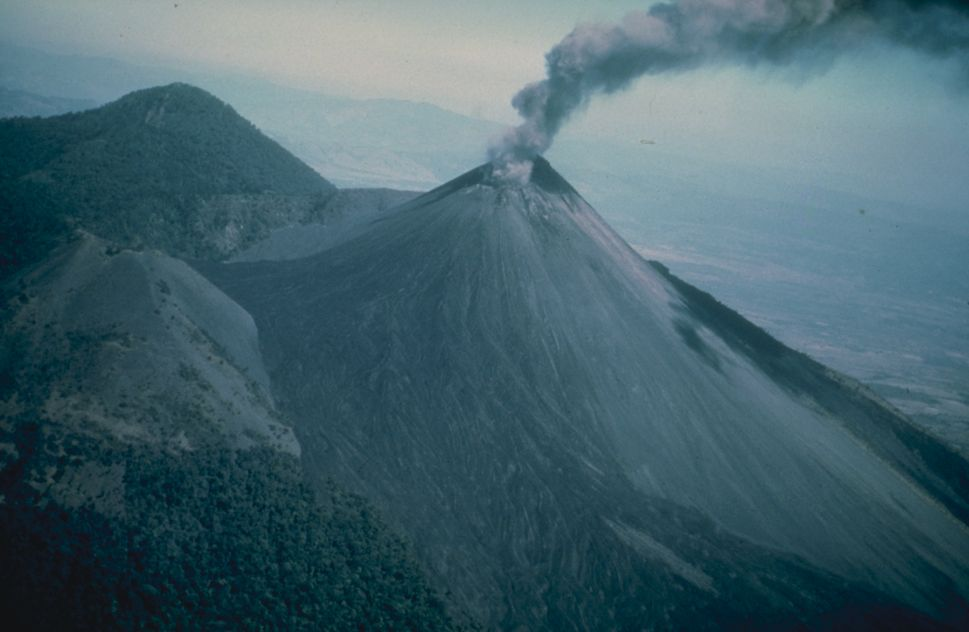
An eruption of Pacaya, Guatemala, in 1976

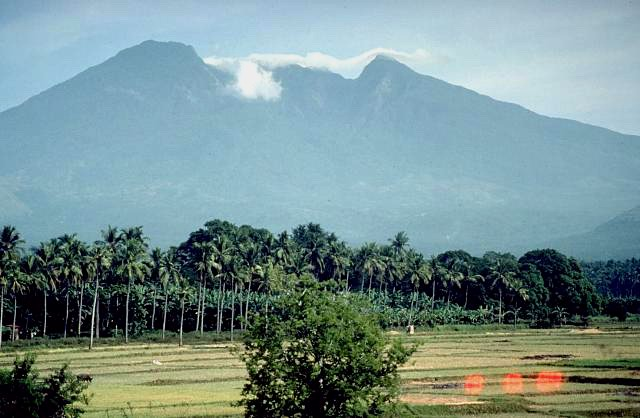
Mount Banahaw, Luzon, the Philippines, in 1989

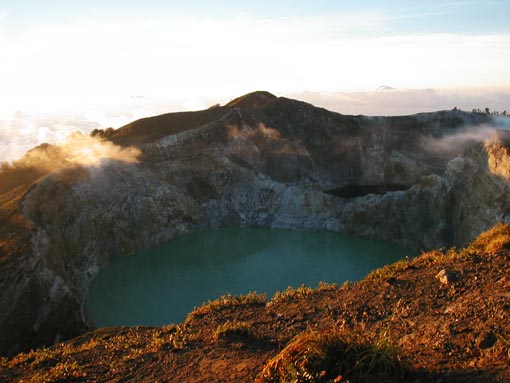
Kelimutu, Flores, Indonesia

A complex volcano, also called a compound volcano or a volcanic complex, is a mixed landform consisting of related volcanic centers and their associated lava flows and pyroclastic rock. They may form due to changes in eruptive habit or in the location of principal vent area on a particular volcano. Stratovolcanoes can also form a large caldera that gets filled in by lava domes, or else multiple small cinder cones, lava domes and craters may develop on the caldera's rim.

Although a comparatively unusual type of volcano, they are widespread in the world and in geologic history. Metamorphosed ash flow tuffs are widespread in the Precambrian rocks of northern New Mexico, which indicates that caldera complexes have been important for much of Earth's history. Yellowstone National Park is on three partly covered caldera complexes. The Long Valley Caldera in eastern California is also a complex volcano; the San Juan Mountains in southwestern Colorado are formed on a group of Neogene-age caldera complexes, and most of the Mesozoic and Cenozoic rocks of Nevada, Idaho, and eastern California are also caldera complexes and their erupted ash flow tuffs. The Bennett Lake Caldera in British Columbia and the Yukon Territory is another example of a Cenozoic (Eocene) caldera complex.

== Examples ==
- Akita-Yake-Yama (Honshū, Japan)
- Asacha (Kamchatka Peninsula, Russia)
- Asama (Honshū, Japan)
- Kusatsu-Shirane (Kusatsu, Gunma, Japan)
- Banahaw (Luzon, Philippines)
- Bennett Lake Caldera (British Columbia/Yukon, Canada)
- Cumbre Vieja (Canary Islands, Spain)
- Mount Edziza volcanic complex (British Columbia, Canada)
- Galeras (Colombia, South America)
- Grozny Group (Kuril Islands, Russia)
- Hakone (Japan)
- Homa Mountain (Kenya)
- Irazú Volcano (Costa Rica)
- Ischia (Italy)
- Kelimutu (Flores, Indonesia)
- Las Pilas (Nicaragua)
- Long Valley Caldera (California, United States)
- Mount Marapi (Indonesia)
- Mount Mazama (Oregon, United States)
- McDonald Islands (Indian Ocean, Australia)
- Mount Meager massif (British Columbia, Canada)
- Morne Trois Pitons (Dominica)
- Moutohora Island (New Zealand)
- Pacaya (Guatemala)
- Puyehue-Cordón Caulle (Chile)
- Rincón de la Vieja Volcano (Costa Rica)
- Silverthrone Caldera (British Columbia, Canada)
- St. Andrew Strait (Admiralty Islands, Papua New Guinea)
- Taal Volcano, (Batangas, Philippines)
- Mount Talinis, (Negros Oriental, Philippines)
- Taupō Volcano, (Taupō, New Zealand)
- Teide, Canary Islands
- Three Sisters (Oregon, United States)
- Te Tatua-a-Riukiuta (Auckland, New Zealand)
- Tongariro, (New Zealand)
- Vesuvius, (Italy)
- Valles Caldera (New Mexico, United States)
- Yellowstone Caldera (Wyoming, United States)

== See also ==
- Volcanic field – Area of Earth's crust prone to localized volcanic activity
- Volcanic group – Collection of related volcanoes or volcanic landforms
