= Grozny Group =

Mountain in Russia

- Location within Far Eastern Federal District

Highest point
- Elevation: 1,158 m (3,799 ft)
- Coordinates: 45.026°N 147.922°E

Geography
- Location: Iturup, Kuril Islands, Russia

Geology
- Mountain type: Complex volcano
- Last eruption: March 2014

Grozny Group (also Grozny Volcano) is a complex volcano located in the central part of Iturup Island, Kuril Islands, controlled by Russia, and claimed by Japan.

There are at least two named volcanoes:

- Japanese: 小田萌山 Odamoi yama
- Japanese: 焼山 Yake-yama

== See also ==
- List of volcanoes in Russia
- List of volcanoes in Japan
