= Oldowan =

Archaeological culture

Coordinates: 36.2009°N 5.6544°E

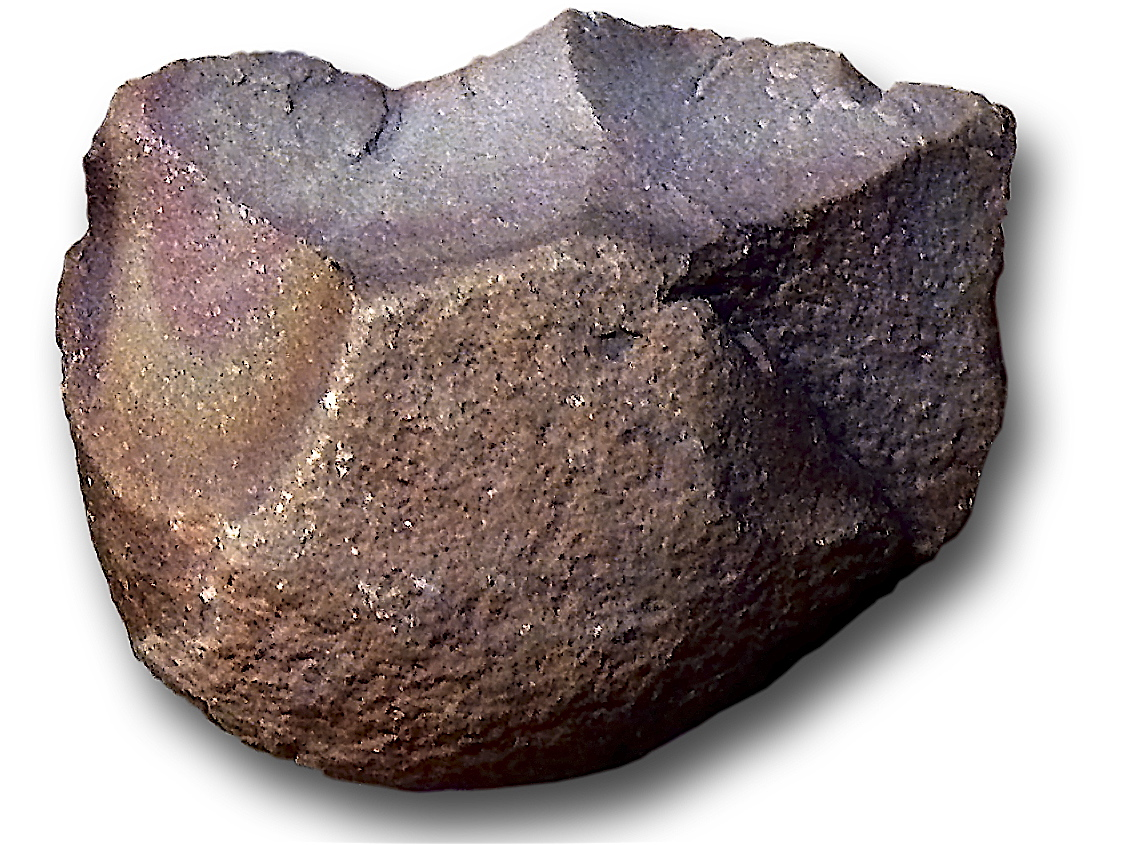
- Carved pebble of Oldowan tradition from the Atlantic Sahara region Guelmim-Es Semara (National Archaeological Museum of Madrid)
- Geographical range: Afro-Eurasia
- Period: Lower Paleolithic
- Dates: 2.9 million years BP – 1.7 million years
- Major sites: Olduvai Gorge
- Preceded by: Lomekwi 3
- Followed by: Acheulean

The Oldowan (or Mode I) was a widespread stone tool archaeological industry during the early Lower Paleolithic spanning the late Pliocene and the first half of the Early Pleistocene. These early tools were simple, usually made by chipping one, or a few, flakes off a stone using another stone. Oldowan tools were used during a period spanning from 2.9 million years ago up until at least 1.7 million years ago (Ma), by ancient hominins (early humans) across much of Africa. This technological industry was followed by the more sophisticated Acheulean industry (two sites associated with Homo erectus at Gona in the Afar Region of Ethiopia dating from 1.5 and 1.26 million years ago have both Oldowan and Acheulean tools).

The term Oldowan is taken from the site of Olduvai Gorge in Tanzania, where the first Oldowan stone tools were discovered by the archaeologist Louis Leakey in the 1930s. However, some contemporary archaeologists and palaeoanthropologists prefer to use the term Mode 1 tools to designate pebble tool industries (including Oldowan), with Mode 2 designating bifacially worked tools (including Acheulean handaxes), Mode 3 designating prepared-core tools, and so forth. The industry is characterised by simple flaked cores and the sharp-edged flakes struck from them, and is the earliest widely accepted stone tool tradition.

Classification of Oldowan tools is still somewhat contentious. Mary Leakey was the first to create a system to classify Oldowan assemblages, and built her system based on prescribed use. The system included choppers, scrapers, and pounders. However, more recent classifications of Oldowan assemblages have been made that focus primarily on manufacture due to the problematic nature of assuming use from stone artefacts. An example is Isaac et al.'s tri-modal categories of "Flaked Pieces" (cores/choppers), "Detached Pieces" (flakes and fragments), "Pounded Pieces" (cobbles utilized as hammerstones, etc.) and "Unmodified Pieces" (manuports, stones transported to sites). Oldowan tools are sometimes called "pebble tools", so named because the blanks chosen for their production already resemble, in pebble form, the final product.

It is not known for sure which hominin species created and used Oldowan tools. Its emergence is often associated with the species Australopithecus garhi and its flourishing with early species of Homo such as H. habilis and H. ergaster.

Early Homo erectus is associated with both Oldowan and later Acheulean technologies. However, it remains debated whether this technological change reflects cumulative cultural transmission or whether at least some early knapping techniques could have been independently reinnovated. Experimental and comparative studies suggest that basic stone-knapping techniques do not necessarily require the copying of technical know-how.

== Dates and ranges ==
The oldest known Oldowan tools have been found at Nyayanga on the Homa Peninsula in Kenya and are dated to ~2.9 million years ago (Ma). The Oldowan tools were associated with Paranthropus teeth and two butchered hippo skeletons. Early Oldowan tools are also known from Gona in Ethiopia (near the Awash River), and are dated to about 2.6 Ma.

The use of tools by apes including chimpanzees and orangutans can be used to argue in favour of tool-use as an ancestral feature of the hominin family. Tools made from bone, wood, or other organic materials were therefore in all probability used before the Oldowan. Oldowan stone tools are simply the oldest recognisable tools which have been preserved in the archaeological record.

There is a flourishing of Oldowan tools in eastern Africa, spreading to southern Africa, between 2.4 and 1.7 Ma. At 1.7 Ma., the first Acheulean tools appear even as Oldowan assemblages continue to be produced. Both technologies are occasionally found in the same areas, dating to the same time periods. This realisation required a rethinking of old cultural sequences in which the more "advanced" Acheulean was supposed to have succeeded the Oldowan. The different traditions may have been used by different species of hominins living in the same area, or multiple techniques may have been used by an individual species in response to different circumstances.

Sometime before 1.8 Ma Homo erectus had spread outside of Africa, reaching as far east as Java by 1.8 Ma and in Northern China by 1.66 Ma. In these newly colonised areas, no Acheulean assemblages have been found. In China, only "Mode 1" Oldowan assemblages were produced, while in Indonesia stone tools from this age are unknown.

By 1.8 Ma early Homo was present in Europe, as shown by the discovery of fossil remains and Oldowan tools in Dmanisi, Georgia. Remains of their activities have also been excavated in Spain at sites in the Guadix-Baza basin and near Atapuerca. Most early European sites yield "Mode 1" or Oldowan assemblages. The earliest Acheulean sites in Europe only appear around 0.5 Ma. In addition, the Acheulean tradition does not seem to spread to Eastern Asia. It is unclear from the archaeological record when the production of Oldowan technologies ended. Other tool-making traditions seem to have supplanted Oldowan technologies by 0.25 Ma.

The discovery of stone tools that predate the Oldowan, dated to as early as 3.3 Ma, at the Lomekwi site in Kenya, was announced in 2015.

This age pre-dates the current estimates for the age of the genus Homo by half a million years, and would fall into the pre-human period, associated with the direct australopithecine ancestors of genus Homo. It is not clear whether the tools of such a "Lomekwian industry" bear any relation to the Oldowan industry.

== Tools ==
=== Manufacture ===
There are articles that address how some Oldowan tools may have been found as stones with naturally occurring shapes that dictate their ideal use, or formed as such. To form the general shape of an Oldowan tool, a roughly spherical hammerstone is struck on the edge, or striking platform, of a suitable core rock to produce a conchoidal fracture with sharp edges useful for various purposes. The process is often called lithic reduction. The chip removed by the blow is the flake. Some of these flakes can be used as tools, provided the aforementioned conditions for the initial stone are met before modification. Below the point of impact on the core is a characteristic bulb with fine fissures on the fracture surface. The flake evidences ripple marks.

The materials of the tools were for the most part quartz, quartzite, basalt, or obsidian, and later flint and chert. Any rock that can hold an edge will do. The main source of these rocks is river cobbles, which provide both hammer stones and striking platforms. The earliest tools were simply split cobbles. It is not always clear which is the flake. Later tool-makers clearly identified and reworked flakes. Complaints that artifacts could not be distinguished from naturally fractured stone have helped spark careful studies of Oldowan techniques. These techniques have now been duplicated many times by archaeologists and other knappers, making misidentification of archaeological finds less likely.

Use of bone tools by hominins also producing Oldowan tools is known from Swartkrans, where a bone shaft with a polished point was discovered in Member (layer) I, dated 1.8–1.5 Ma. The Osteodontokeratic industry, the "bone-tooth-horn" industry hypothesized by Raymond Dart, is less certain.

=== Shapes and uses ===
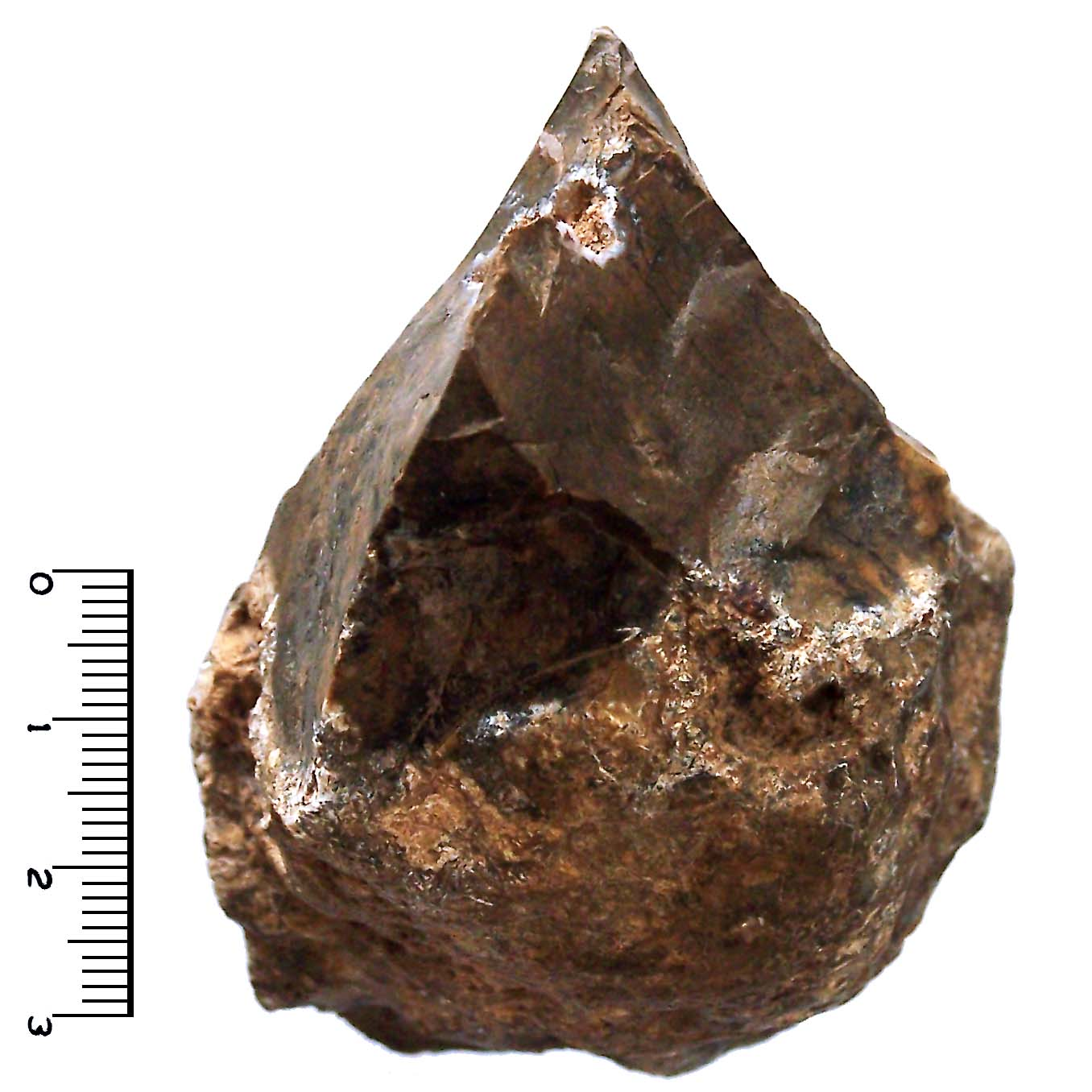
Oldowan-tradition stone chopper.

Mary Leakey classified the Oldowan tools as Heavy Duty, Light Duty, Utilized Pieces and Debitage, or waste. Heavy-duty tools are mainly cores. A chopper has an edge on one side. It is unifacial if the edge was created by flaking on one face of the core, or bifacial if on two. Discoid tools are roughly circular with a peripheral edge. Polyhedral tools are edged in the shape of a polyhedron. In addition there are spheroidal hammer stones.

Light-duty tools are mainly flakes. There are scrapers, awls (with points for boring) and burins (with points for engraving). Some of these functions belong also to heavy-duty tools. For example, there are heavy-duty scrapers.

Utilized pieces are tools that began with one purpose in mind but were utilized opportunistically. Because of their use and variation, opportunities lead to the frequent modification of tools for either labor or forms of signaling has been proposed as a cause for the different shapes of similar tools.

Oldowan tools were probably used for many purposes, which have been discovered from observation of modern apes and hunter-gatherers. Nuts and bones are cracked by hitting them with hammer stones on a stone used as an anvil. Battered and pitted stones testify to this possible use.

Heavy-duty tools could be used as axes for woodworking. Once a branch was separated, it could be scraped clean with a scraper, or hollowed with pointed tools. Such uses are attested by characteristic microscopic alterations of edges used to scrape wood. Oldowan tools could also have been used for preparing hides. Hides must be cut by slicing, piercing and scraping them clean of residues. Flakes are most suitable for this purpose.

Lawrence Keeley, following in the footsteps of Sergei Semenov, conducted microscopic studies (with a high-powered optical microscope) on the edges of tools manufactured de novo and used for the originally speculative purposes described above. He found that the marks were characteristic of the use and matched marks on prehistoric tools. Studies of the cut marks on bones using an electron microscope produce a similar result.

=== Abbevillian ===
Abbevillian is a currently obsolescent name for a tool tradition that is increasingly coming to be called Oldowan. The label Abbevillian prevailed until the Leakey family discovered older (yet similar) artifacts at Olduvai Gorge and promoted the African origin of man. Oldowan soon replaced Abbevillian in describing African and Asian lithics. The term Abbevillian is still used but is now restricted to Europe. The label, however, continues to lose popularity as a scientific designation.

In the late 20th century, discovery of the discrepancies in date caused a crisis of definition. Because Abbevillian did not necessarily precede Acheulean and both traditions had flakes and bifaces, it became difficult to differentiate the two. It was in this spirit that many artifacts formerly considered Abbevillian were labeled Acheulean. In consideration of the difficulty, some preferred to name both phases Acheulean. When the topic of Abbevillian came up, it was simply put down as a phase of Acheulean. Whatever was from Africa was Oldowan, and whatever from Europe, Acheulean.

The solution to the definition problem is to define the types in terms of complexity. Simply struck tools are Oldowan. Retouched, or reworked tools are Acheulean. Retouching is a second working of the artifact. The manufacturer first creates an Oldowan tool. Then he reworks or retouches the edges by removing very small chips so as to straighten and sharpen the edge. Typically but not necessarily the reworking is accomplished by pressure flaking.

== Tool users ==
The exact hominid responsible for the archaeological evidence is up for debate; pseudoscientists claim only the genus Homo line was intelligent enough to develop Oldowan tools, though this is largely due to religious bias with intelligent design components. Despite this conjecture, copious fossil evidence showed evolutionary features for human precision grip capabilities in Australopithecines. This leads to current anthropological thinking in which Oldowan tools were made by late Australopithecus and early Homo. Homo habilis was named "skillful" because it was considered the earliest tool-using human ancestor. Indeed, the genus Homo was in origin intended to separate tool-using species from their tool-less predecessors, hence the name of Australopithecus garhi, garhi meaning "surprise", a tool-using Australopithecine discovered in 1996 and described as the "missing link" between the genera Australopithecus and Homo. There is also evidence that some species of Paranthropus utilized stone tools.

There is presently no evidence to show that Oldowan tools were the sole creation of members of the Homo line or that the ability to produce them was a special characteristic of only our ancestors. Research on tool use by modern wild chimpanzees in West Africa shows there is an operational sequence when chimpanzees use lithic implements to crack nuts. In the course of nut cracking, sometimes they will create unintentional flakes. Although the morphology of the chimpanzees' hammer is different from the Oldowan hammer, chimpanzees' ability to use stone tools indicates that the earliest lithic industries were probably not produced by only one kind of hominin species.

Findings from fossil evidence and experimental replication of stone-tool users and manufacturers suggest the presence of physical characteristics of hand morphology for precise stone tool making. The makers of Oldowan tools were mainly right-handed. "Handedness" (lateralization) had thus already evolved, though it is not clear how related to modern lateralization it was, since other animals show handedness as well.

In the mid-1970s, Glynn Isaac touched off a debate by proposing that human ancestors of this period had a "place of origin" and that they foraged outward from this home base, returning with high-quality food to share and to be processed. Over the course of the last 30 years, a variety of competing theories about how foraging occurred have been proposed, each one implying certain kinds of social strategy. The available evidence from the distribution of tools and remains is not enough to decide which theories are the most probable. However, three main groups of theories predominate.

- Glynn Isaac's model was one of Central Place Foraging. Critics accused him of attributing too much "modern" behavior to early hominins with relatively free-form searches outward.
- A second group of models took modern chimpanzee behavior as a starting point, having the hominids use relatively fixed routes of foraging, and leaving tools where it was best to do so on a constant track.
- A third group of theories had relatively loose bands scouring the range, taking care to move carcasses from dangerous death sites and leaving tools more or less at random.

Each group of models implies different grouping and social strategies, from the relative altruism of central base models to the relatively disjointed search models. (See also central foraging theory and Lewis Binford.)

Hominins probably lived in social groups that had contact with others. This conclusion is supported by the large number of bones at many sites, too large to be the work of one individual, and all of the scatter patterns implying many different individuals. Since modern primates in Africa have fluid boundaries between groups, as individuals enter, become the focus of bands, and others leave, it is also probable that the tools we find are the result of many overlapping groups working the same territories, and perhaps competing over them. Because of the huge expanse of time and the multiplicity of species associated with possible Oldowan tools, it is difficult to be more precise than this, since it is almost certain that different social groupings were used at different times and in different places.

There is also the question of what mix of hunting, gathering and scavenging the tool users employed. Early models focused on the tool users as hunters. The animals butchered by the tools include waterbuck, hartebeest, springbok, pig and zebra. However, the disposition of the bones allows some question about hominin methods of obtaining meat. That they were omnivores is unquestioned, as the digging implement and the probable use of hammer stones to smash nuts indicate. Lewis Binford first noticed that the bones at Olduvai contained a disproportionately high incidence of extremities, which are low in food substance. He concluded other predators had taken the best meat, and the hominins had only scavenged. The counter view is that while hunting many large animals would be beyond the reach of an individual human, groups could bring down larger game, as pack hunting animals are capable of doing. Moreover, since many animals both hunt and scavenge, it is possible that hominins hunted smaller animals, but were not above driving carnivores from larger kills, as they probably were driven from kills themselves from time to time.

== Sites and archaeologists ==
A complete catalog of Oldowan sites would be too extensive for listing here. Some of the better-known sites include the following:

Map of Afro-Eurasia showing important sites of the Oldowan industry (clickable map).

=== Africa ===
==== Ethiopia ====
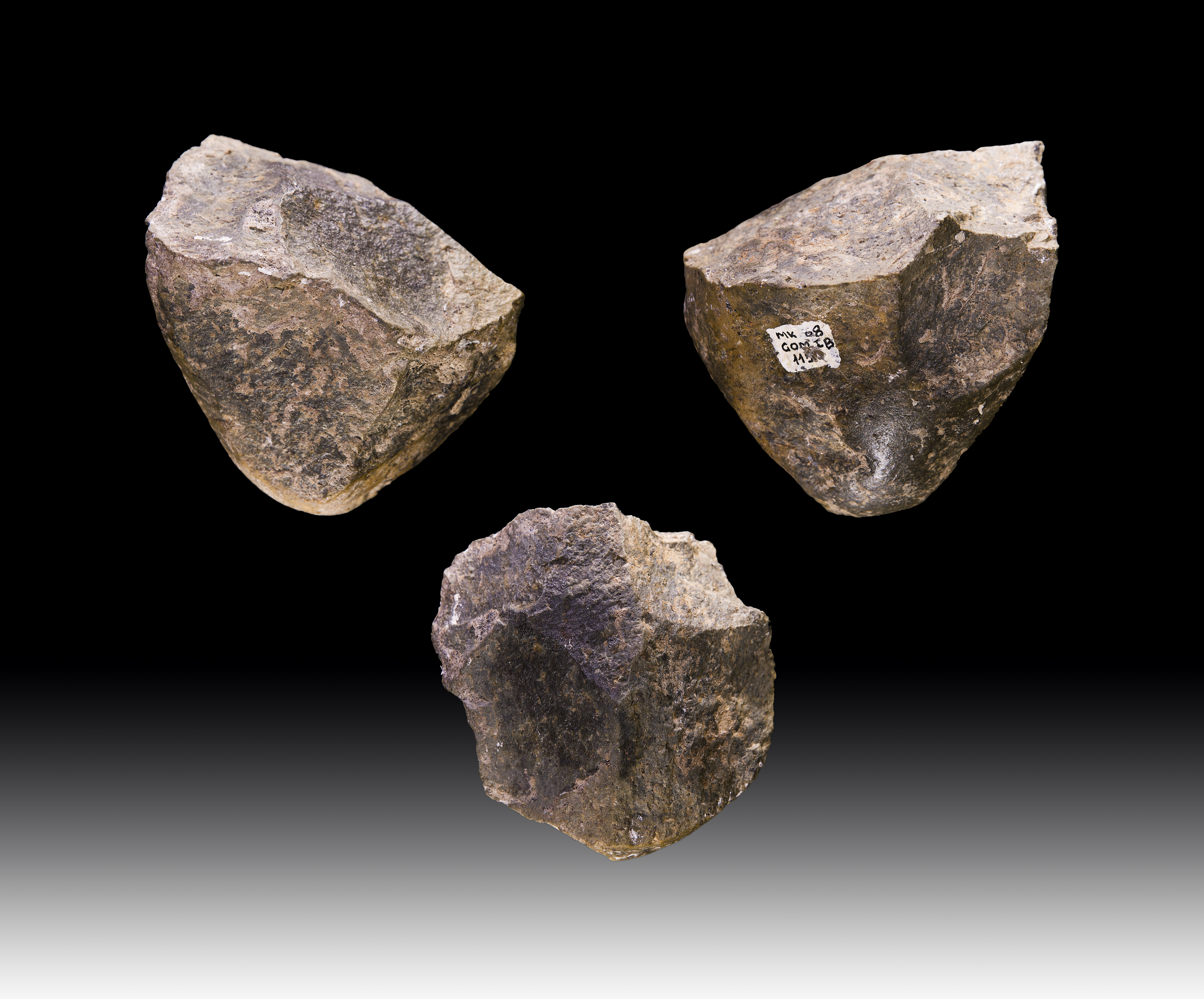
Oldowan choppers dating to 1.7 million years BP, from Melka Kunture, Ethiopia

===== Afar Triangle =====
Sites in the Gona river system in the Hadar region of the Afar triangle, excavated by Helene Roche, J. W. Harris and Sileshi Semaw, yielded some of the oldest known Oldowan assemblages, dating to about 2.6 million years ago. Raw material analysis done by Semaw showed that some assemblages in this region are biased towards a certain material (e.g.: 70% of the artifacts at sites EG10 and EG12 were composed of trachyte) indicating a selectivity in the quality of stone used. Recent excavations have yielded tools in association with cut-marked bones, indicating that Oldowan were used in meat-processing or -acquiring activities.

===== Omo River basin =====
The second oldest known Oldowan tool site comes from the Shungura Formation of the Omo River basin. This formation documents the sediments of the Plio-Pleistocene and provides a record of the hominins that lived there. Lithic assemblages have been classified as Oldowan in members E and F in the lower Omo basin. Although there have been lithic assemblages found in multiple sites in these areas, only the Omo sites 57 and 123 in member F are accepted as hominin lithic remains. The assemblages at Omo sites 71 and 84 in member E do not show evidence of hominin modification and are therefore classified as natural assemblages.

The tools are never found in direct association with the hominins, but archaeologists believe that they would be the strongest candidates for tool manufacture. There are no hominins in those layers, but the same layers elsewhere in the Omo valley contain Paranthropus and early Homo fossils. Paranthropus occurs in the preceding layers. In the last layer at 1.4 million years ago is only Homo erectus.

==== Egypt ====
Along the Nile River, within the 100-foot terrace, evidence of Chellean or Oldowan cultures has been found.

==== Algeria ====
In November 2018 Science published a report of Oldowan artefacts in a secure dating context of 1.9 to 2.4 Ma from Ain Boucherit (Ain Hanech) in Setif.

==== Kenya ====
===== Homa Peninsula =====
Kanjera South, part of the Kanjera site complex, and Nyayanga are located on the Homa Peninsula. Kanjera South is estimated to around 2 Ma. while Nyayanga is estimated to 2.9 Ma. One of the significant excavations, in the area, is Leakey's expedition in 1932–35. In 1995, Oldowan and Plio-Pleistocene faunal remains surfaced from the site, and in 2015 excavations led to the discovery of the earliest Oldowan stone tool technology in association with Paranthropus fossils and butchered hippo remains from Nyayanga.

===== East Turkana =====
The numerous Koobi Fora sites on the east side of Lake Turkana are now part of Sibiloi National Park. Sites were initially excavated by Richard Leakey, Meave Leakey, Jack Harris, Glynn Isaac and others. Currently the artifacts found are classified as Oldowan or KBS Oldowan dated from 1.9 to 1.7 Ma, Karari (or "advanced Oldowan") dated to 1.6–1.4 Ma, and some early Acheulean at the end of the Karari. Over 200 hominins have been found, including Australopithecus and Homo.

===== West Turkana =====
In the Nachukui site in West Turkana, around 500 stone tools were found at a site named Naiyena Engol 2, or NY2. The assemblage at NY2 dates back to 1.8–1.7 Ma, around the peak of the Oldowan period. At the site, freehand flaking was observed to be the most common type of technique for making these tools. A common theme among sites in West Turkana is the high percentage of small flake tools gathered in the assemblages. However, NY2 seems to lack many of these tools, indicating a low productivity rate of flakes.

===== Kilombe =====
Acheulian stone tools have been known about at Kilombe Main site in the central rift of Kenya since the 1970s with excavations by John Gowlett for his PhD. More recently, Oldowan technology has also been discovered in Kilombe Caldera in an unusual high altitude setting. The stone tools are associated with fossils and have been dated to 1.8 Ma, with Acheulian stone tools occurring in overlying levels.

==== Tanzania ====
===== Olduvai Gorge =====
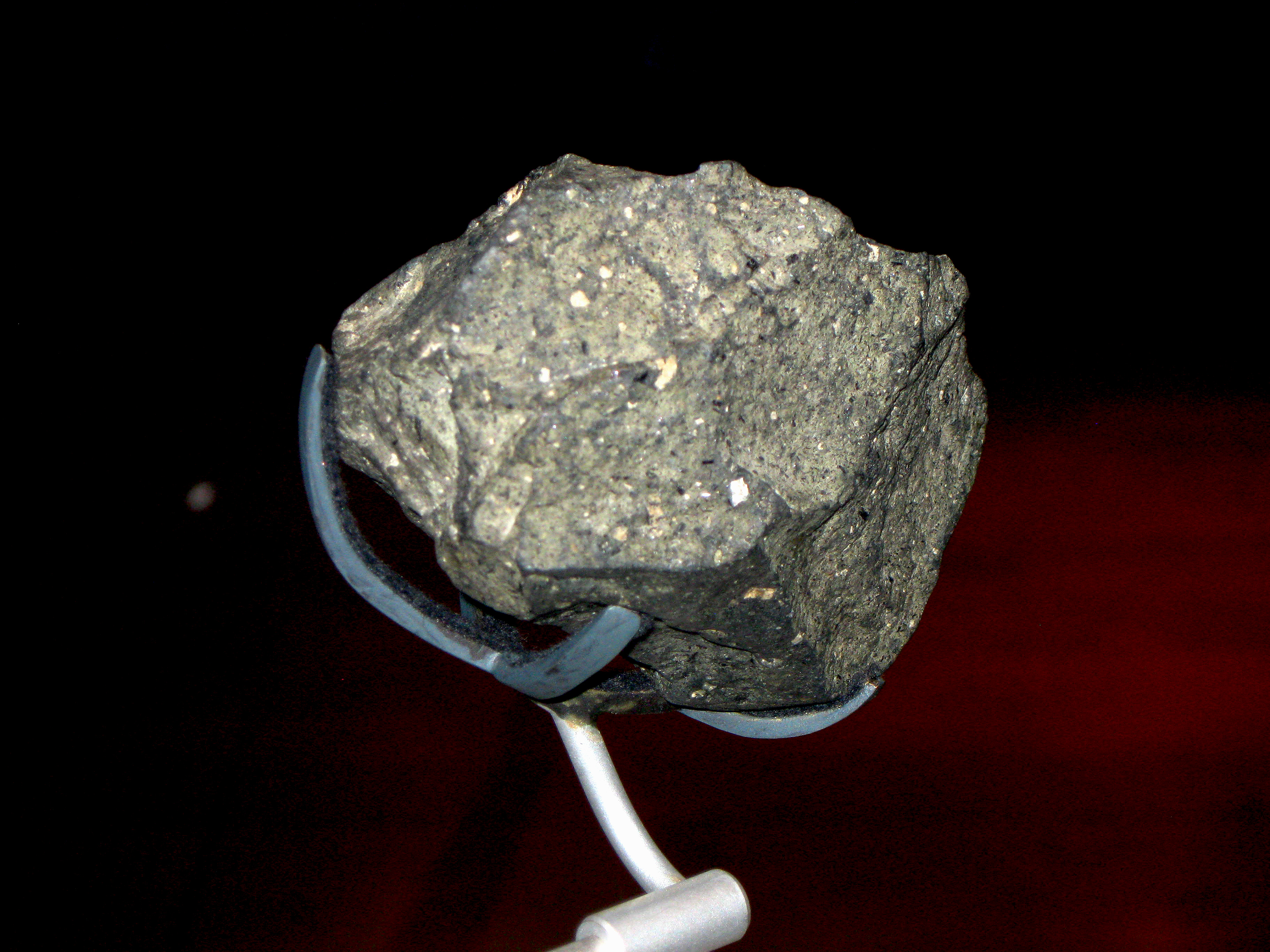
Chopper from Olduvai Gorge, some 1.8 million years old

The Oldowan industry is named after discoveries made in the Olduvai Gorge of Tanzania in east Africa by the Leakey family, primarily Mary Leakey, but also her husband Louis and their son, Richard. Mary Leakey organized a typology of Early Pleistocene stone tools, which developed Oldowan tools into three chronological variants, A, B and C. Developed Oldowan B is of particular interest due to changes in morphology that appear to have been driven mostly by the short term availability of a chert resource from 1.65 to 1.53 Ma. The flaking properties of this new resource resulted in considerably more core reduction and a higher prevalence of flake retouch. Similar tools had already been found in various locations in Europe and Asia for some time, where they were called Chellean and Abbevillian.

The oldest tool sites are in the East African Rift system, on the sediments of ancient streams and lakes. This is consistent with what we surmise of the evolution of man.

==== South Africa ====
Abbé Breuil was the first recognized archaeologist to go on record to assert the existence of Oldowan tools. While his description was for "Chello-Abbevillean" tools, and post-dated Leakey's finds at Olduvai Gorge by at least ten years, his descriptions nonetheless represented the scholarly acceptance of this technology as legitimate. These findings were cited as being from the location of the Vaal River, at Vereeniging, and Breuil noted the distinct absence of a significant number of cores, suggesting a "portable culture". At the time, this was considered very significant, as portability supported the conclusion that the Oldowan tool-makers were capable of planning for future needs, by creating the tools in a location which was distant from their use.

===== Swartkrans =====
The Swartkrans site is a cave filled with layered fossil-bearing limestone deposits. Oldowan is found in Member 1 Lower Bank at 2.2-1.8 Ma in association with Paranthropus robustus and a single fossil attributed to Homo. The Member I assemblage also includes a shaft of pointed bone polished at the pointed end. Member I contained a high percentage of primate remains compared to other animal remains, which did not fit the hypothesis that H. habilis or P. robustus lived in the cave. C. K. Brain conducted a more detailed study and discovered the cave had been the abode of leopards, who preyed on the hominins.

===== Sterkfontein =====
Another site of limestone caves is Sterkfontein, found in South Africa. This site contains a large number of not only Oldowan tools, but also early Acheulean technology.

Drimolen

The cave site of Drimolen has yielded 6 stone tools attributed to the Oldowan as well as 65 bone tools, along with specimens of Paranthropus robustus and Homo erectus

=== Europe ===
==== Georgia ====
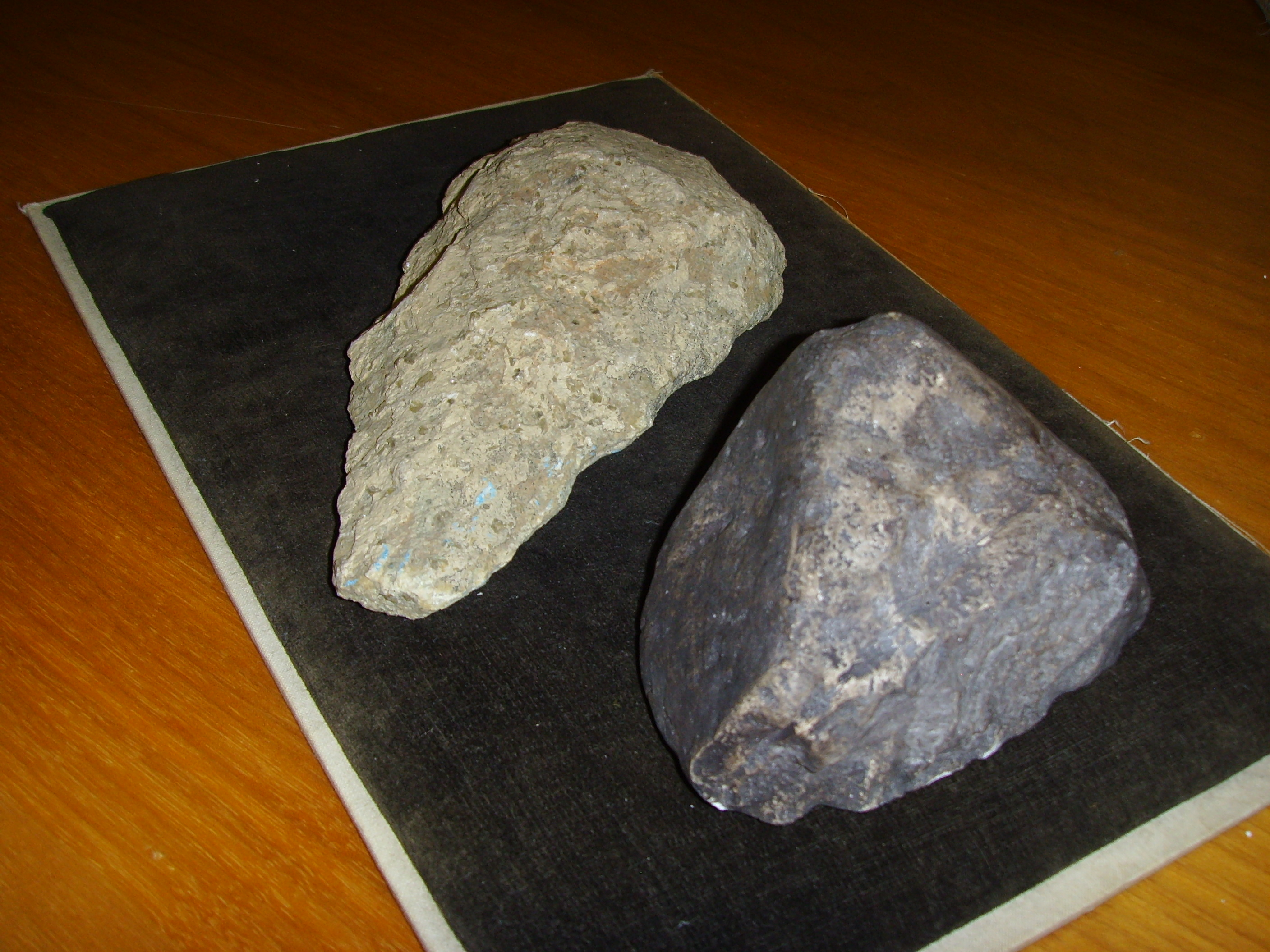
Oldowan stone tool from Dmanisi paleontological site (right, 1.8 mya, replica), compared with the more recent Acheulean technology (left)

In 1999 and 2002, two Homo erectus skulls (H. georgicus) were discovered at Dmanisi in southern Georgia. The archaeological layer in which the human remains, hundreds of Oldowan stone tools, and numerous animal bones were unearthed is dated approximately 1.83-1.6 Ma. The site yields the earliest unequivocal evidence for presence of early humans outside the African continent.

==== Bulgaria ====
At Kozarnika, in the ground layers, dated to 1.6-1.4 Ma, archaeologists have discovered a human molar tooth, lower palaeolithic assemblages that belong to a core-and-flake non-Acheulian industry and incised bones that may be the earliest example of human symbolic behaviour.

==== Russia ====
Ainikab-1 and Muhkay-2 (North Caucasus, Daghestan) are the extraordinary sites in relation to date and the culture. Geological and geomorphological data, palynological studies and paleomagnetic testing unequivocally point to Early Pleistocene (Eopleistocene), indicating the age of the sites as being within the range of 1.8 – 1.2 Ma.

==== Spain ====
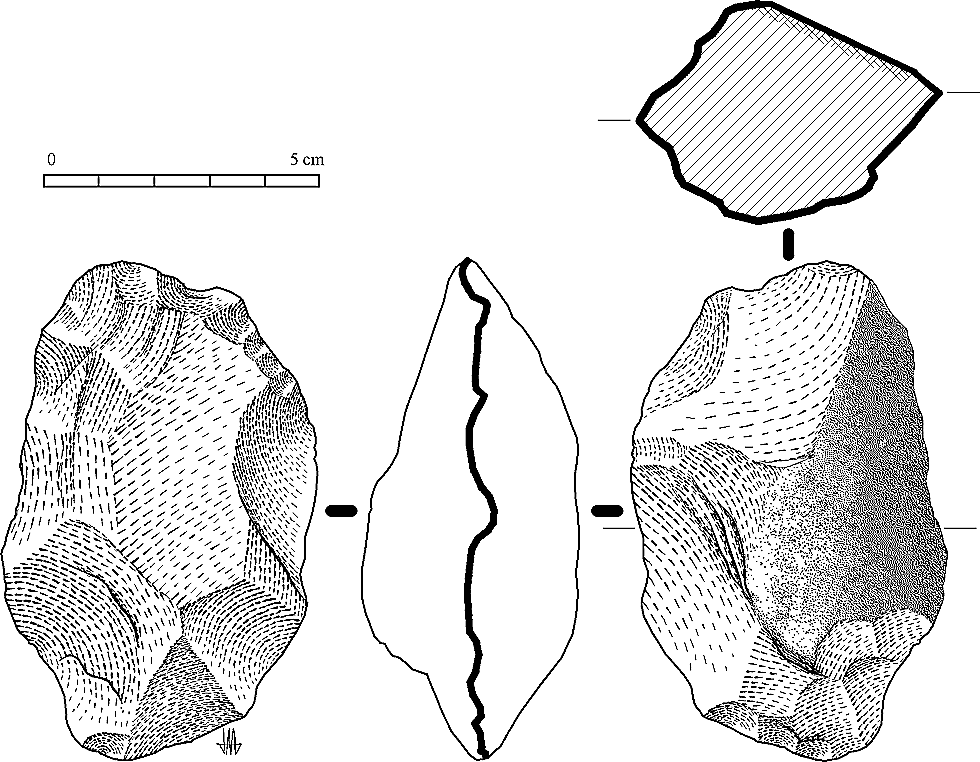
Extremely archaic handaxe from the Quaternary fluvial terraces of Duero river (Valladolid, Spain) dated to Oldowan/Abbevillian period (Lower Paleolithic).

Oldowan tools have been found at the following sites: Fuente Nueva 3, Barranco del Leon, Sima del Elefante, Atapuerca TD 6.

==== France ====
Oldowan tools have been found at: Lézignan-la-Cèbe, 1.5 Ma; Abbeville, 1–0.5 Ma; Vallonnet cave, French Riviera; Soleihac, open-air site in Massif Central. Oldowan tools have also been found at Tautavel in the foothills of the Pyrenees. These were discovered by Henry de Lumbley alongside human remains (cranium). The tools are of limestone and quartz.

==== Elsewhere ====
Oldowan tools have been found in Italy at the Monte Poggiolo open air site dated to approximately 850 ka, making them the oldest evidence of human habitation in Italy. In Germany tools have been found in river gravels at Kärlich dating from 300 ka. In the Czech Republic tools have been found in ancient lake deposits at Przeletice and a cave site at Stranska Skala, dated no later than 500 ka. In Hungary tools have been found at a spring site at Vértesszőlős dating from 500 ka.

=== Asia ===
==== China ====
At the Xihoudu site in China, 32 stone tools were found, including choppers, scrapers, and 3-edged tools. These tools were dated back to 1.8 Ma. This site also included cultural artifacts, such as animal fossils, burnt bones, and cut antlers. The presence of numerous fish and beaver fossils near the stone tools indicate the existence of a body of water at the site.

==== Pakistan ====
In Pakistan, Oldowan tools have been found at Riwat during a 1980s excavation. Many of the stones found at this site were considered waste products of stone tool production, as they were small flakes chipped off of larger stones. In total, 1,479 tools and flakes were discovered at this site.

==== Syria ====
An excavated site at El Kowm (Aïn al Fil, (de:Aïn al Fil)), Syria revealed a plethora of Oldowan tools. In a 2m^{2} test pit excavated in 2008, 790 artifacts were found, with many pebble tools, cores, flakes, manuports, and flake debris. Although many of these tools show little sign of modification, several of the pebble tools are distinctly-shaped bifacial and trifacial choppers. Dated between 2.0 and 1.8 Ma, these stone tools are some of the earliest Near East finds.

Because of their location in the Syrian desert, these tools have raised questions about the path of early hominin dispersal. The predominant theory that early hominins traveled along the Mediterranean, through what is now Israel, into Europe has been challenged, as the presence of these Oldowan tools indicate that an alternate route may have been taken.

==== Iran ====
In Iran, 80 tools of different assemblages have been discovered at 7 sites in the Kashafrud Basin. Although many of the artifacts found here, dated at 1.8 Ma, were pre-Acheulean, some are of the Oldowan tradition, resembling East African Oldowan finds. Containing cores, choppers, flake, chunks, and hammer stones made predominately of quartz, this site displayed the ability of early toolmakers to work skillfully with fragile stones.

==== Israel ====
The site at Bizat Ruhama (near kibbutz Ruhama) has shown evidence that the complexity of the stone tool-making process was more complex than researchers previously thought, leading to a new perspective on the capabilities of invention and adaptability of Oldowan hominin populations.

Another key find at the Bizat Ruhama site was that of the secondary flakes. The discovery of these secondary flakes have led researchers to believe that this was an intentional response to a raw material constraint.

According to the micro-morphological studies at the Bizat Ruhama site, the archaeological assemblages represent one or several occupations of the site in a relatively short time frame.

== Sources ==
- Braidwood, Robert J., Prehistoric Men, many editions.
- Domínguez-Rodrigo, M.; Pickering, T. R.; Semaw, S.; Rogers, M. J. (2005). "Cutmarked bones from Pliocene archaeological sites at Gona, Afar, Ethiopia: Implications for the function of the world's oldest stone tools". Journal of Human Evolution. 48 (2): 109–121. Bibcode:2005JHumE..48..109D. doi:10.1016/j.jhevol.2004.09.004. PMID 15701526.
- Edey, Maitland A., The Missing Link, Time-Life Books, 1972.
- Schick, Kathy D.; Toth, Nicholas, Making Silent Stones Speak', Simon & Schuster, 1993, ISBN 0-671-69371-9
- Semaw, Sileshi (2000). "The World's Oldest Stone Artefacts from Gona, Ethiopia: Their Implications for Understanding Stone Technology and Patterns of Human Evolution Between 2·6–1·5 Million Years Ago". Journal of Archaeological Science. 27 (12): 1197–1214. Bibcode:2000JArSc..27.1197S. doi:10.1006/jasc.1999.0592. S2CID 1490212.
- Isaac, Glynn and Harris, JWK The Scatter between the Patches 1975
- Isaac, Glynn (1978). "The Food Sharing Behavior of Protohuman Hominids". Scientific American. 238 (4): 90–108. Bibcode:1978SciAm.238d..90I. doi:10.1038/scientificamerican0478-90. PMID 418504.
- Binford, Lewis R. (1987). "Searching for Camps and Missing the Evidence?". The Pleistocene Old World. Interdisciplinary Contributions to Archaeology. pp. 17–31. doi:10.1007/978-1-4613-1817-0_2. ISBN 978-1-4612-9016-2.
- Toth, Nicholas (1985). "The oldowan reassessed: A close look at early stone artifacts". Journal of Archaeological Science. 12 (2): 101–120. Bibcode:1985JArSc..12..101T. doi:10.1016/0305-4403(85)90056-1.
- Susman, Randall L. (1991). "Who Made the Oldowan Tools? Fossil Evidence for Tool Behavior in Plio-Pleistocene Hominids". Journal of Anthropological Research. 47 (2): 129–151. doi:10.1086/jar.47.2.3630322. JSTOR 3630322. S2CID 159678644.
- Susman, Randall L. (1998). "Hand function and tool behavior in early hominids". Journal of Human Evolution. 35 (1): 23–46. Bibcode:1998JHumE..35...23S. doi:10.1006/jhev.1998.0220. PMID 9680465.
- Hayden, Brian (2015). "Insights into early lithic technologies from ethnography". Philosophical Transactions of the Royal Society B: Biological Sciences. 370 (1682). doi:10.1098/rstb.2014.0356. PMC 4614719. PMID 26483534.
- Shea, John J. (2010). "Stone Age Visiting Cards Revisited: A Strategic Perspective on the Lithic Technology of Early Hominin Dispersal". Out of Africa I. Vertebrate Paleobiology and Paleoanthropology. pp. 47–64. doi:10.1007/978-90-481-9036-2_4. ISBN 978-90-481-9036-2.
- Marzke, Mary W. (1997). "Precision grips, hand morphology, and tools". American Journal of Physical Anthropology. 102 (1): 91–110. doi:10.1002/(sici)1096-8644(199701)102:1<91::aid-ajpa8>3.0.co;2-g. PMID 9034041.
