= Mount Homa =

Mountain located in western Kenya

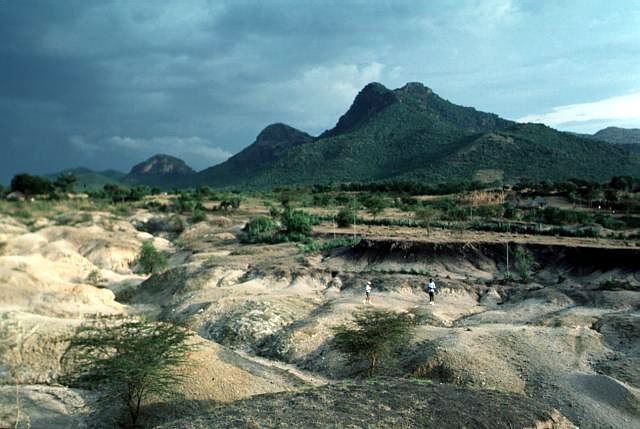
- Mount Homa in 1994

Highest point
- Elevation: 1,751 m (5,745 ft)
- Coordinates: 0°23′S 34°30′E

Geography
- Location within Kenya
- Location: Kenya

Geology
- Formed by: Volcanism along the Gregory Rift
- Mountain type: Complex volcano
- Last eruption: Unknown

Mount Homa is a complex volcano located in western Kenya. It forms a broad peninsula on the southern shore of Winam Gulf, an extension of Lake Victoria. This peninsula defines Homa Bay and the mountaintop is about 20 kilometres (12 mi) north of the town of that name.

Although no documented eruptions have happened during the Holocene, it has an active geothermal field with water temperatures reaching as high as 80 C. This is interpreted as heat being generated by a magma chamber below Homa and shows that the volcano is still potentially active.

In the Luo language Got Uma or God Marahuma means "famous mountain".

The mountain is formed of carbonatite lava and dates from Miocene to Pleistocene. Along with the active Ol Doinyo Lengai, it is one of the very few carbonatite volcanoes in the world.

Homa peninsula is part of Homa Bay County. The village of Kanjira (Kanjera) is eponymous of the Kanjera paleontological site, first excavated by Louis Leakey in the 1930s. It is one of the oldest known Oldowan sites, dated at c. 2 million years old.

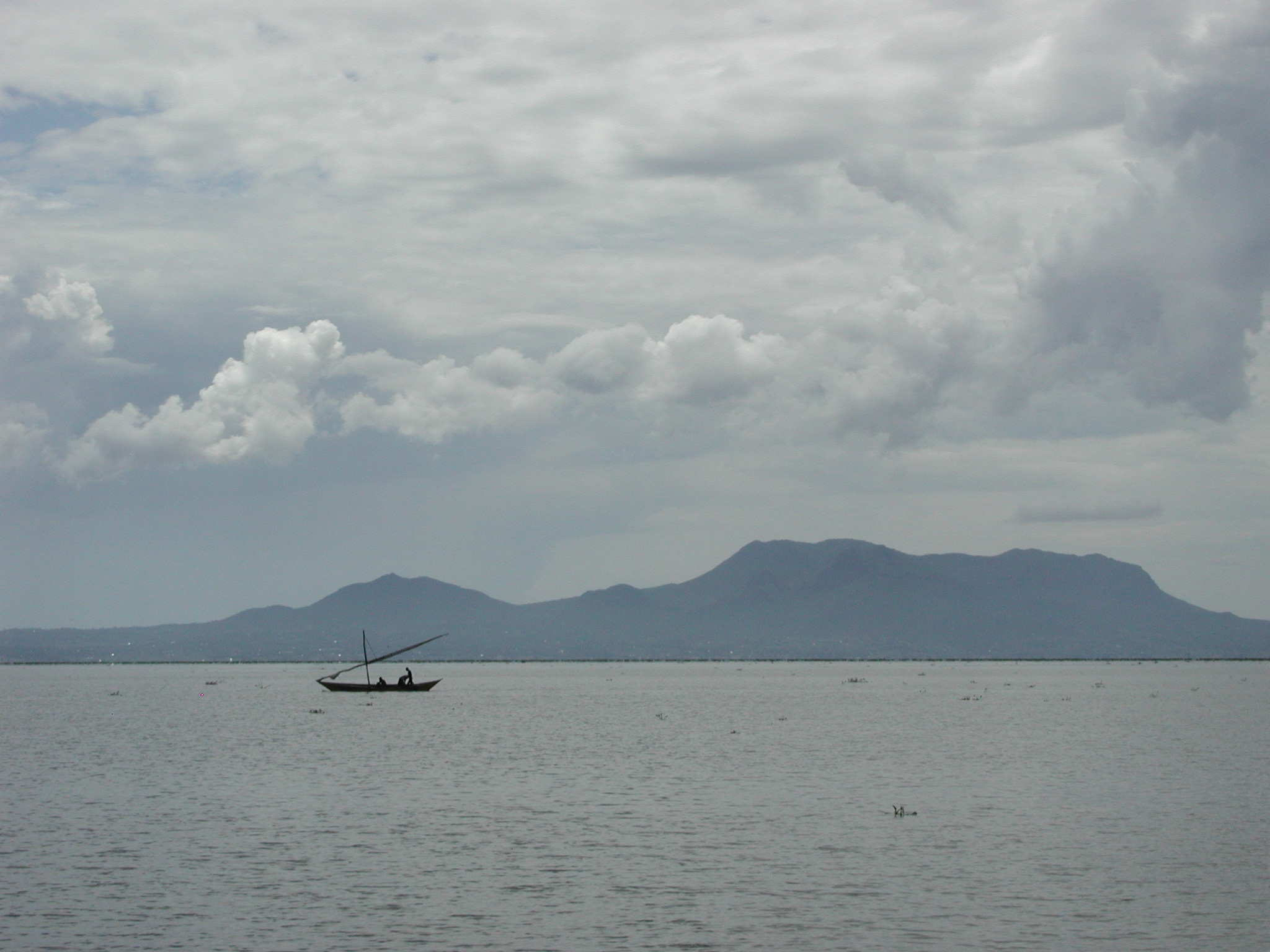
Mount Homa, on Lake Victoria, Kenya. View from across Winam Gulf, looking south.

== See also ==
- List of volcanoes in Kenya
