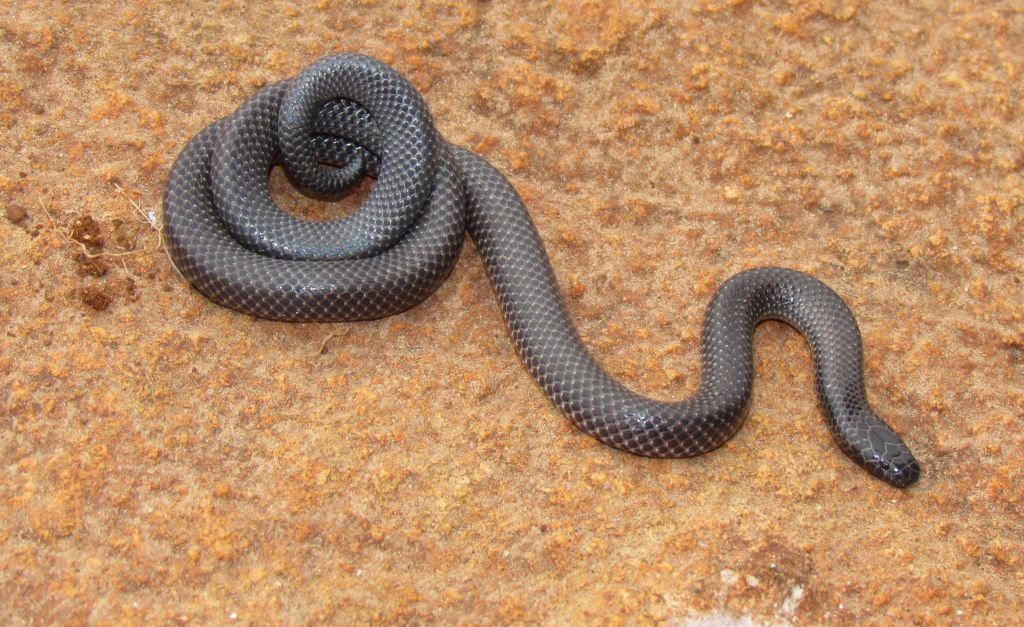
- Black-headed Micrelaps (Micrelaps vaillanti)

Conservation status
- Least Concern (IUCN 3.1)

Scientific classification
- Kingdom: Animalia
- Phylum: Chordata
- Class: Reptilia
- Order: Squamata
- Suborder: Serpentes
- Family: Micrelapidae
- Genus: Micrelaps
- Species: M. vaillanti

Binomial name
- Micrelaps vaillanti (Mocquard, 1888)

Synonyms
- Elaposchema vaillanti Mocquard, 1888; Calamelaps vaillanti — Boettger, 1893; Micrelaps vaillanti — Boulenger, 1896; Rhinocalamus meleagris Sternfeld, 1908; Micrelaps nigriceps Sternfeld, 1910; Micrelaps boettgeri — Loveridge, 1955; Micrelaps vaillanti — Rasmussen, 2002

= Micrelaps vaillanti =

Species of snake

Micrelaps vaillanti, also known commonly as the black-headed micrelaps or the Somali two-headed snake, is a species of mildly venomous rear-fanged snake in the family Micrelapidae. The species is endemic to Africa.

== Etymology ==
The specific name, vaillanti, is in honor of French herpetologist Léon Vaillant.

== Geographic range ==
M. vaillanti is found in Ethiopia, Kenya, Somalia, eastern Sudan, Tanzania, and Uganda.

== Habitat ==
The preferred natural habitats of M. vaillanti are shrubland and savanna, at altitudes from sea level to 1,800 m (5,900 ft).

== Description ==
M. vaillanti is brown dorsally, with the center of each dorsal scale grayish white. The ventrals are brown in the middle, and whitish on the sides.

Adults may attain a total length of 28.2 cm (11 in), with a tail 32 mm (1 1/4 in) long.

The dorsal scales are smooth, without pits, and are arranged in 15 rows at midbody (in 17 rows on the neck). The ventrals number 171–203. The anal plate is divided, and the subcaudals are also divided.

The head is very flattened. The rostral is large, twice as broad as deep, the portion visible from above about 2/3 as long as its distance from the frontal. The internasals are twice as broad as long, and twice as long as the prefrontals. The frontal is small, 1 1/2 times as long as broad, as long as its distance from the end of the snout, much shorter than the parietals. The supraocular is as long as broad. There is one very small postocular. The temporals are arranged 1+1. There are seven upper labials, the third in contact with the prefrontal, the third and fourth (or third, fourth, and fifth) entering the eye. There are four lower labials in contact with the anterior chin shield. The two pairs of chin shields (anterior and posterior) are subequal in size.

== Reproduction ==
M. vaillanti is oviparous.
