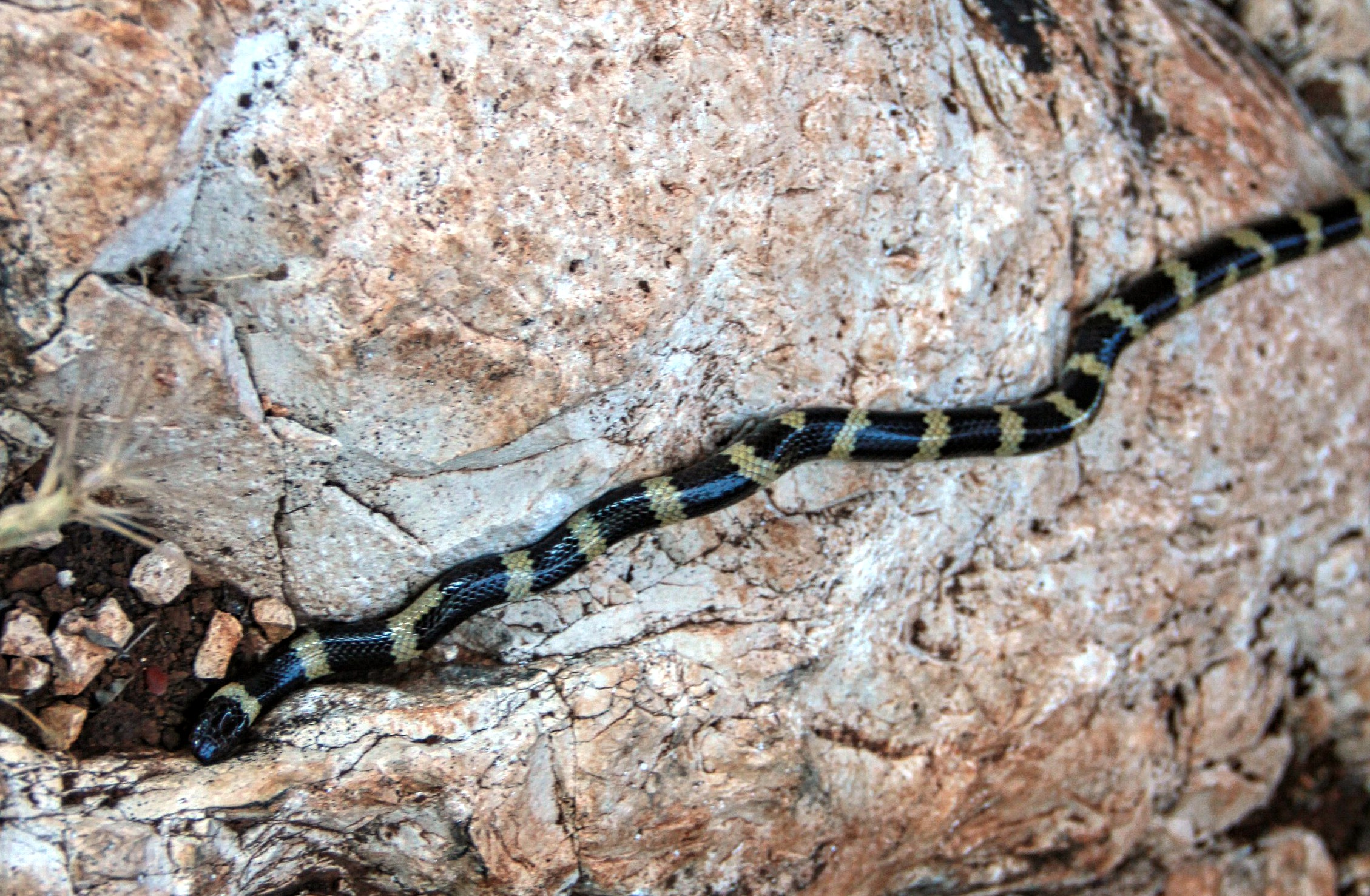
- Micrelaps muelleri

Scientific classification
- Kingdom: Animalia
- Phylum: Chordata
- Class: Reptilia
- Order: Squamata
- Suborder: Serpentes
- Superfamily: Elapoidea
- Family: Micrelapidae; S. Das et al., 2023
- Genus: Micrelaps; Boettger, 1880

Synonyms
- Elaposchema Mocquard, 1888

= Micrelaps =

Genus of snakes

Micrelaps is a genus of rear-fanged mildly venomous snakes. It is the only genus in the family Micrelapidae. The genus is native to Africa and the Middle East, and there are four species that are recognized as being valid.

== Taxonomy ==
Until very recently, this genus was classified in the family Atractaspididae. However, a phylogenomic study published in 2023 on the Molecular Phylogenetics and Evolution journal has concluded that the genus should be re-classified into an autonomous family, apart from Atractaspididae, and thus created a new family called Micrelapidae, which constitutes a new Afro-Asian family of snakes.

== Description ==
Species in the genus Micrelaps share the following characters: the maxilla is very short, with two teeth, followed, after an interspace, by a very large grooved fang situated below the eye. The mandibular teeth are longest anteriorly. The head is small, and is not distinct from the neck. The eye is minute, and the pupil is round or vertically subelliptic. The nostril is pierced in a single nasal scale. There is no loreal scale. There are no preocular scales, the prefrontal entering the eye. The body is cylindrical, and the tail is short. The dorsal scales are smooth, without pits, and are in 15 rows at midbody. The ventral scales are rounded. The subcaudal scales are in two rows.

== Species ==
Genus Micrelaps - five species
Species	Taxon author	Subsp.*	Common name	Geographic range
M. bicoloratus	Sternfeld, 1908	moyeri	Kenya two-headed snake	Kenya
M. boettgeri	Boulenger, 1896	————	Boettger's two-headed snake	Sudan, Somalia, Ethiopia, Kenya, Uganda
M. muelleri	Boettger, 1880	————	Mueller's two-headed snake	Israel, Palestine, Syria, Jordan, Lebanon
M. vaillanti	(Mocquard, 1888)	————	Somali two-headed snake	Ethiopia, Kenya, Somalia, eastern Sudan, Tanzania, and Uganda

*) Not including the nominate subspecies ^{T}) Type species
