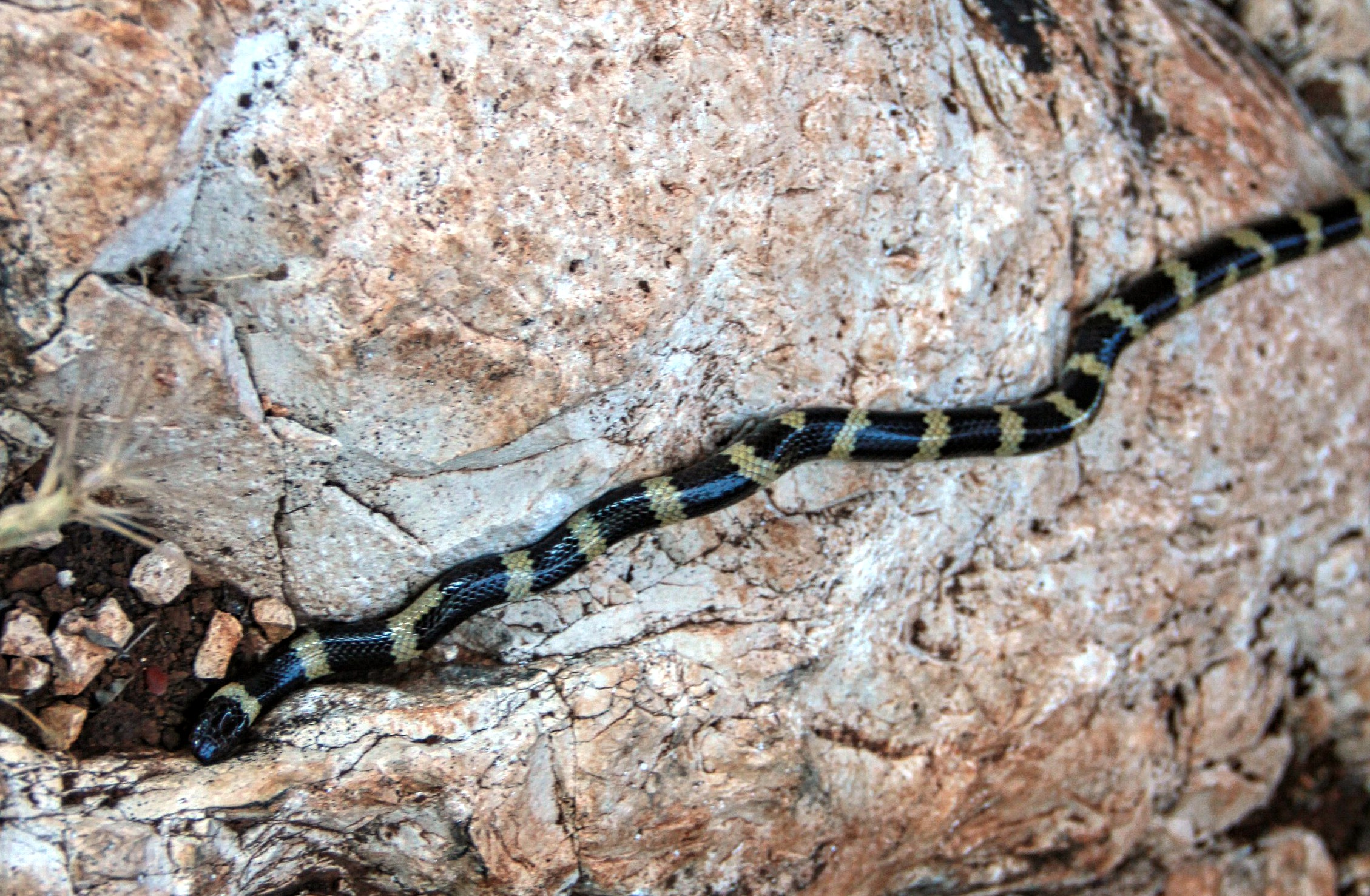

Conservation status
- Least Concern (IUCN 3.1)

Scientific classification
- Kingdom: Animalia
- Phylum: Chordata
- Class: Reptilia
- Order: Squamata
- Suborder: Serpentes
- Family: Micrelapidae
- Genus: Micrelaps
- Species: M. muelleri

Binomial name
- Micrelaps muelleri Boettger, 1880

Synonyms
- Micrelaps tchernovi Y. Werner, 2006

= Micrelaps muelleri =

Species of snake

Common names: Müller's black-headed snake, Mueller's two-headed snake, Muller's snake.

Micrelaps muelleri is a species of mildly venomous rear-fanged snake in the family Micrelapidae. The species is endemic to the Middle East.

== Taxonomy ==
Micrelaps muelleri is the type species for the genus Micrelaps. There are no subspecies of M. muelleri that are recognized as being valid. The former species M. tchernovi was synonymized with M. muelleri by Jamison et al. in 2020.

== Etymology ==
The specific name, muelleri, is in honor of Swiss herpetologist Fritz Müller.

== Geographic range ==
Micrelaps muelleri is found in Israel, Palestine (West Bank), Jordan, Lebanon, and Syria.

== Description ==
Micrelaps muelleri is black, with whitish zigzag-edged rings, which may be narrower or wider than the spaces between them, mostly interrupted ventrally.

Adults may attain a total length of 40.5 cm (15.9 in), which includes a tail 3 cm (1.2 in) long.

The dorsal scales are smooth, without apical pits, and arranged in 15 rows at midbody. The ventrals number 251–275. The anal plate is divided. The subcaudals, which are also divided, number 26–32.

The head is very flattened. The rostral is nearly twice as broad as deep, just visible from above. The internasals are a little broader than long, shorter than the prefrontals. The frontal is small, not broader than the supraocular, 1 2/3 times as long as broad, hardly as long as its distance from the rostral, half as long as the parietals. Each supraocular is as long as broad. A small postocular is in contact with the first temporal. The temporals are arranged 1+1 or 1+2. There are seven upper labials, the third and fourth entering the eye. There are three or four lower labials in contact with the anterior chin shield. The anterior chin shields are as long as the posterior chin shields.

== Reproduction ==
Micrelaps muelleri is oviparous.

== Habitat ==
The preferred habitats of M. muelleri include Mediterranean-type shrubby vegetation, and arable land, and it has been found in villages.

== Conservation status ==
Micrelaps muelleri is classified as "least concern" (LC) according to the IUCN Red List of Threatened Species. Although its range is relatively restricted, there are not believed to be major threats to it. It is present in some protected areas.
