= Muller's snake =

Muller's snake or Müller's snake is a common name for several snakes and may refer to:

- Micrelaps muelleri, native to the Middle East
- Rhinoplocephalus bicolor, native to Australia
