= Starry forest skink =

There are two species of skink named starry forest skink:

- Sphenomorphus annamiticus, a species found in Vietnam and Cambodia
- Sphenomorphus stellatus, a species found in Malaysia
