= Micrelaps boettgeri =

Scientific classification
- Kingdom: Animalia
- Phylum: Chordata
- Class: Reptilia
- Order: Squamata
- Suborder: Serpentes
- Family: Micrelapidae
- Genus: Micrelaps
- Species: M. boettgeri

Binomial name
- Micrelaps boettgeri Boulenger, 1896

Species of snake

Micrelaps boettgeri, commonly known as Boettger's two-headed snake, is a species of mildly venomous rear-fanged snake in the family Micrelapidae. The species is endemic to Africa.

== Etymology ==
The specific name, boettgeri, is in honor of German herpetologist Oskar Boettger, author of the genus Micrelaps.

== Geographic range ==
Boettger's two-headed snake is found in Ethiopia, Kenya, Somalia, Sudan, and Uganda.

== Description ==
Dorsally, M. boettgeri is blackish brown, with each scale having a terminal round white spot. The head's upper surface and the neck's nape are black. The ventrals are edged with white.

The type specimen, a female, is 23.5 cm (9 1/4 in) in total length, including the tail which is 2 cm (3/4 in) long.

The dorsal scales are smooth, in 15 rows at the midbody (in 17 rows on the neck). The ventrals number 203-221; the anal plate is divided; the subcaudals number 22–23, also divided (in two rows).

The portion of the rostral visible from above is as long as its distance from the frontal. The internasals are slightly broader than long, shorter than the prefrontals. The frontal is small, 1½ times as long as broad, as long as its distance from the rostral, much shorter than the parietals. There is one postocular. The temporals are arranged 1+1. There are seven upper labials, the third and fourth entering the eye, the fifth forming a suture with the parietal. There are four lower labials in contact with the anterior chin shield. There are two pairs of chin shields, the anterior pair and the posterior pair subequal in size.
