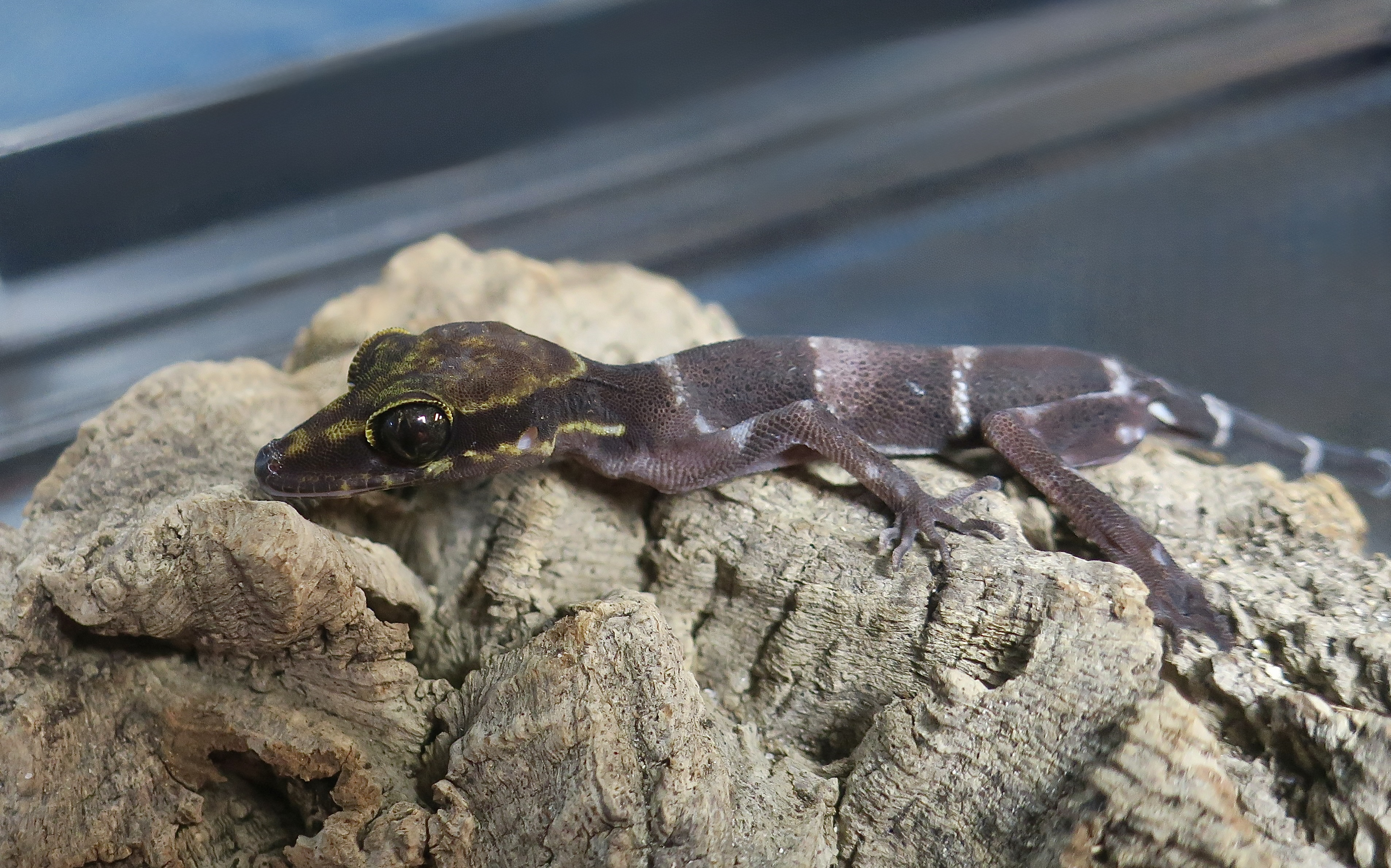

Scientific classification
- Kingdom: Animalia
- Phylum: Chordata
- Class: Reptilia
- Order: Squamata
- Suborder: Gekkota
- Family: Gekkonidae
- Genus: Cyrtodactylus
- Species: C. badenensis

Binomial name
- Cyrtodactylus badenensis Nguyen, Orlov & Darevsky, 2006

= Cyrtodactylus badenensis =

Species of lizard

Cyrtodactylus badenensis is a gecko from Indochina, particularly South Vietnam.

== Description ==
This species can be distinguished by its enlarged femoral scales and its absence of femoral pores; 8-10 lower labials, 10–13 upper labials, 2 internasal scales; 18-22 subdigital lamellae on its fourth toe of its hindlimb; and about 25-28 scale rows around its midbody.
