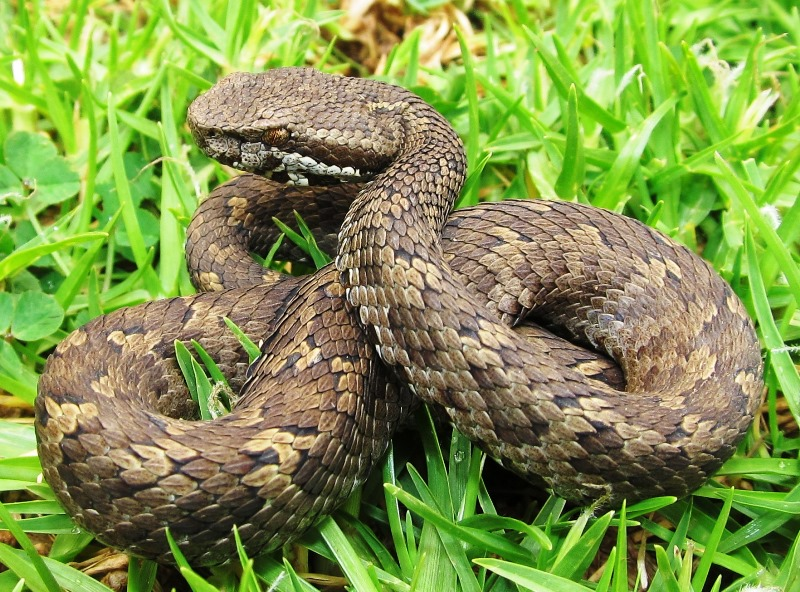

Conservation status
- Least Concern (IUCN 3.1)

Scientific classification
- Kingdom: Animalia
- Phylum: Chordata
- Class: Reptilia
- Order: Squamata
- Suborder: Serpentes
- Family: Viperidae
- Genus: Craspedocephalus
- Species: C. strigatus

Binomial name
- Craspedocephalus strigatus Gray, 1842

Synonyms
- Trimesurus [sic] strigatus Gray, 1842; Atropos Darwini A.M.C. Duméril, Bibron & A.H.A. Duméril, 1854; Trigonocephalus (Cophias) neelgherriensis Jerdon, 1854; Trimesurus Nielgherriensis — Beddome, 1862; T[rigonocephalus]. Darwini — Jan, 1859; B[othrops] Darwini — Jan, 1863; T[rimeresurus]. strigolus Theobald, 1868; Crotalus Trimeres[urus]. strigatus — Higgins, 1873; T[rimeresurus]. strigatus — Theobald, 1876; T[rigonocephalus]. Nilghiriensis Theobald, 1876; Lachesis strigatus — Boulenger, 1896; Trimeresurus strigatus — M.A. Smith, 1943; P[rotobothrops]. strigatus — Kraus, Mink & W.M. Brown, 1996; Trimeresurus strigatus — Herrmann et al., 2004; Trimeresurus (Craspedocephalus) strigatus — David et al., 2011; Craspedocephalus strigatus — Wallach et al., 2014

= Craspedocephalus strigatus =

Species of reptile

Craspedocephalus strigatus, commonly known as the horseshoe pit viper, is a species of venomous snake in the subfamily Crotalinae of the family Viperidae. The species is endemic to the Western Ghats of India. There are no subspecies that are recognized as being valid.

== Geographic range ==
Endemic to the Western Ghats, in Karnataka, Tamil Nadu, and Kerala states of South India, C. strigatus is distributed in the Upper Nilgiri Mountains (Whitaker & Captain, 2004). Historically it was misidentified and misreported from extralimital localities from both the Western Ghats and the Eastern Ghats. Perhaps this is the species of pitviper confirmed from India to have the smallest geographic range of all.

The type locality listed is "Cape of Good Hope?" and "Madras?" (Madras Presidency [and not the City], India). The former must be a mistake. Boulenger (1896) restricted the type locality to "Madras Presidency".

== Habitat ==
The preferred natural habitats of C. strigatus are montane forests, shola patches, and grasslands, at altitudes of 1,100–2,400 m (3,600–7,900 ft).

== Behaviour ==
C. strigatus is terrestrial, with most of the sightings on the ground or on rock formations. It is probably diurnal, but its natural history is poorly known.

== Diet ==
C. strigatus preys upon frogs, smaller snakes, and small rodents such as mice.

== Description ==
C. strigatus may be distinguished from other pit vipers of peninsular India based on the presence of small internasals, the second supralabial in contact with the loreal pit, 21 rows of smooth or weakly-keeled dorsal scales at midbody, and a single row of scales between labials and suboculars. The common name of the species is based on the presence of a pale buff horseshoe-shaped (i.e., inverted "U") mark on the nape. Dorsally, the snake is pale brownish or buff-coloured with darker blotches of grey and some white streaks.

Of 12 snakes measured, the mean snout-to-vent length (SVL) was 24.4 ± 7.04 cm (9.6 ± 2.8 in), the tail length (tL) was 3.5 ± 0.8 cm (1.4 ± 0.3 in), and the weight was 172 ± 10.5 g (6 ± 0.4 oz).
