= Prefrontal =

Prefrontal may refer to:

- Prefrontal bone, a skull bone in some tetrapods
- Prefrontal cortex, a region of the brain of a mammal
- Prefrontal scales, a set of scales near the tip of the snout of a reptile
