= Craspedocephalus occidentalis =

Scientific classification
- Kingdom: Animalia
- Phylum: Chordata
- Class: Reptilia
- Order: Squamata
- Suborder: Serpentes
- Family: Viperidae
- Genus: Craspedocephalus
- Species: C. occidentalis

Binomial name
- Craspedocephalus occidentalis (Pope & Pope, 1933)

Synonyms
- Trimeresurus occidentalis Pope & Pope, 1933

Species of South Indian snake

Craspedocephalus occidentalis is a venomous species of arboreal pit viper from Southern India. It has been confused for Craspedocephalus gramineus often. It is named after the Latin word for 'west', 'occidentalis', as it is from the western portion of Southern India.

== Habitat ==
It is known to inhabit the trees in the wet forests of the Western Ghats.
