= Fritz Müller (doctor) =

Swiss doctor, zoologist, and herpetologist

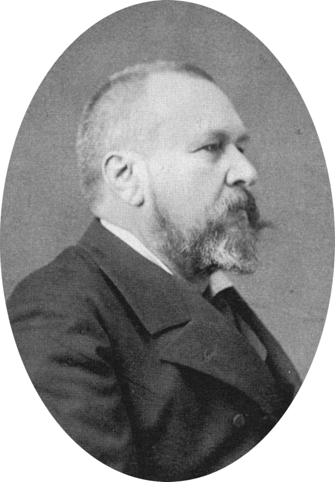
Fritz Müller

Friedrich "Fritz" Müller (8 May 1834 – 10 March 1895) was a Swiss doctor, zoologist, and herpetologist.

He was born in Basel and studied at the University of Basel from 1852 to 1854, and then at Würzburg and Prague, where he became a medical doctor in 1857. After further experience in Vienna, Paris and Berlin, he returned to Basel to practise medicine.

He was a founder member of the regional medical society in 1860 and took a leading role in the sanitary services in Basel, which he directed from 1872.

He gave public lectures in zoology at the university from 1868. His zoological work focussed on reptiles, amphibians, crustaceans and arachnids.

From 1873, he suffered from a chronic illness as a result of which he spent periods near the Mediterranean. He died in Basel.

== Eponyms ==
In 1885 Fritz Müller described Rhinoplocephalus bicolor, commonly known as "Müller's snake", and in 1889 he described Nessia sarasinorum, a species of skink sometimes referred to as "Müller's nessia".

His name is also associated with the herpetological species Eryx muelleri (Müller's sand boa) and Calamaria muelleri (Mueller's reed snake), both species being described by George Albert Boulenger; and with Micrelaps muelleri (Müller's black-headed snake), a species of venomous snake described by Oskar Boettger.
