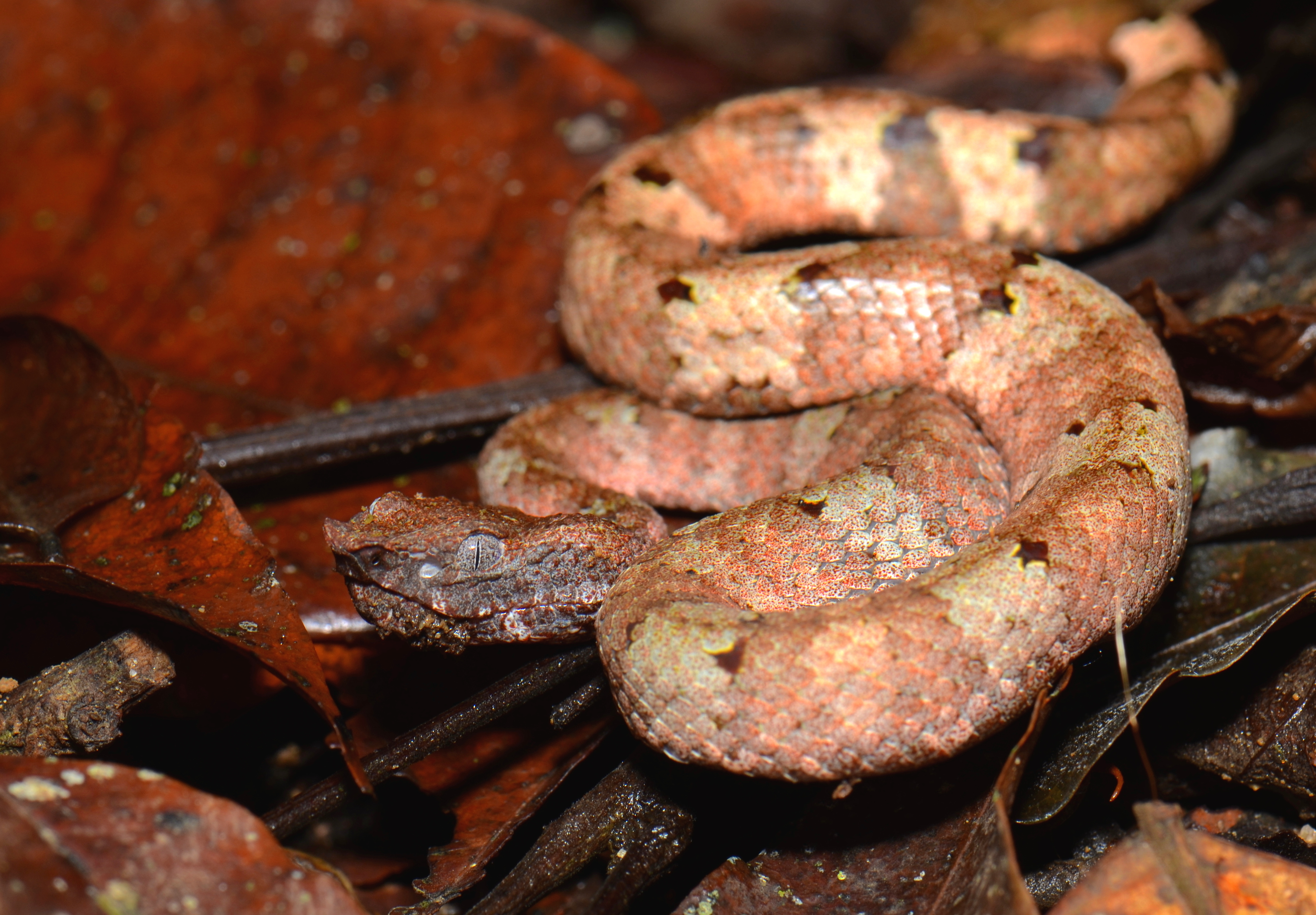

Conservation status
- Least Concern (IUCN 3.1)

Scientific classification
- Kingdom: Animalia
- Phylum: Chordata
- Class: Reptilia
- Order: Squamata
- Suborder: Serpentes
- Family: Viperidae
- Genus: Craspedocephalus
- Species: C. andalasensis

Binomial name
- Craspedocephalus andalasensis (David, Vogel, Vijaykumar & Vidal, 2006)

Synonyms
- Trimeresurus andalasensis David, Vogel, Vijaykumar & Vidal, 2006

= Craspedocephalus andalasensis =

Species of snake

Craspedocephalus andalasensis, commonly known as the Sumatran palm pit viper, is a venomous pitviper species native to the Indonesian island of Sumatra.

== Geographic range ==
C. andalasensis is known from North Sumatra and West Sumatra. Though known from a few specimens only, it is likely to be widespread in Sumatra.

== Habitat and conservation ==
C. andalasensis occurs in wet montane forests at elevations of 500–1,130 m (1,640–3,710 ft) above sea level. Although it is negatively impacted by deforestation, it is believed to be widespread enough to not be threatened overall. C. andalasensis occurs in the Mount Leuser National Park.
