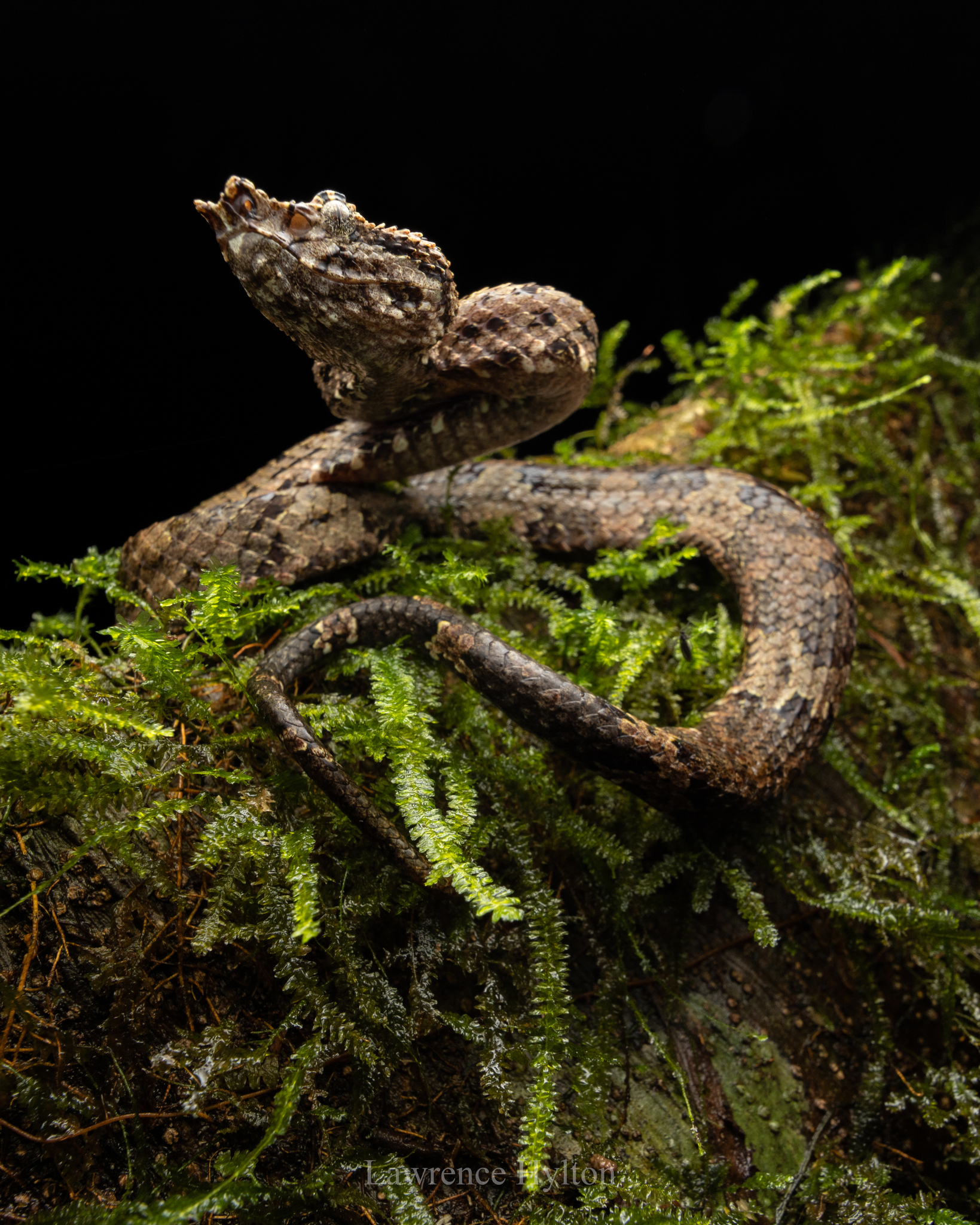
- Craspedocephalus borneensis in Malaysia

Conservation status
- Least Concern (IUCN 3.1)

Scientific classification
- Kingdom: Animalia
- Phylum: Chordata
- Class: Reptilia
- Order: Squamata
- Suborder: Serpentes
- Family: Viperidae
- Genus: Craspedocephalus
- Species: C. borneensis

Binomial name
- Craspedocephalus borneensis (W. Peters, 1872)

Synonyms
- Atropophis borneensis W. Peters, 1872; Bothrops sandakanensis Lidth de Jeude, 1893; Lachesis borneensis – Boulenger, 1896; Trimeresurus borneensis – Barbour, 1912; Trimeresurus (Craspedocephalus) borneensis – David et al., 2011

= Craspedocephalus borneensis =

Species of snake

Craspedocephalus borneensis, commonly known as the Bornean pit viper, is a venomous pit viper species endemic to the island of Borneo. No subspecies are currently recognized.

== Description ==
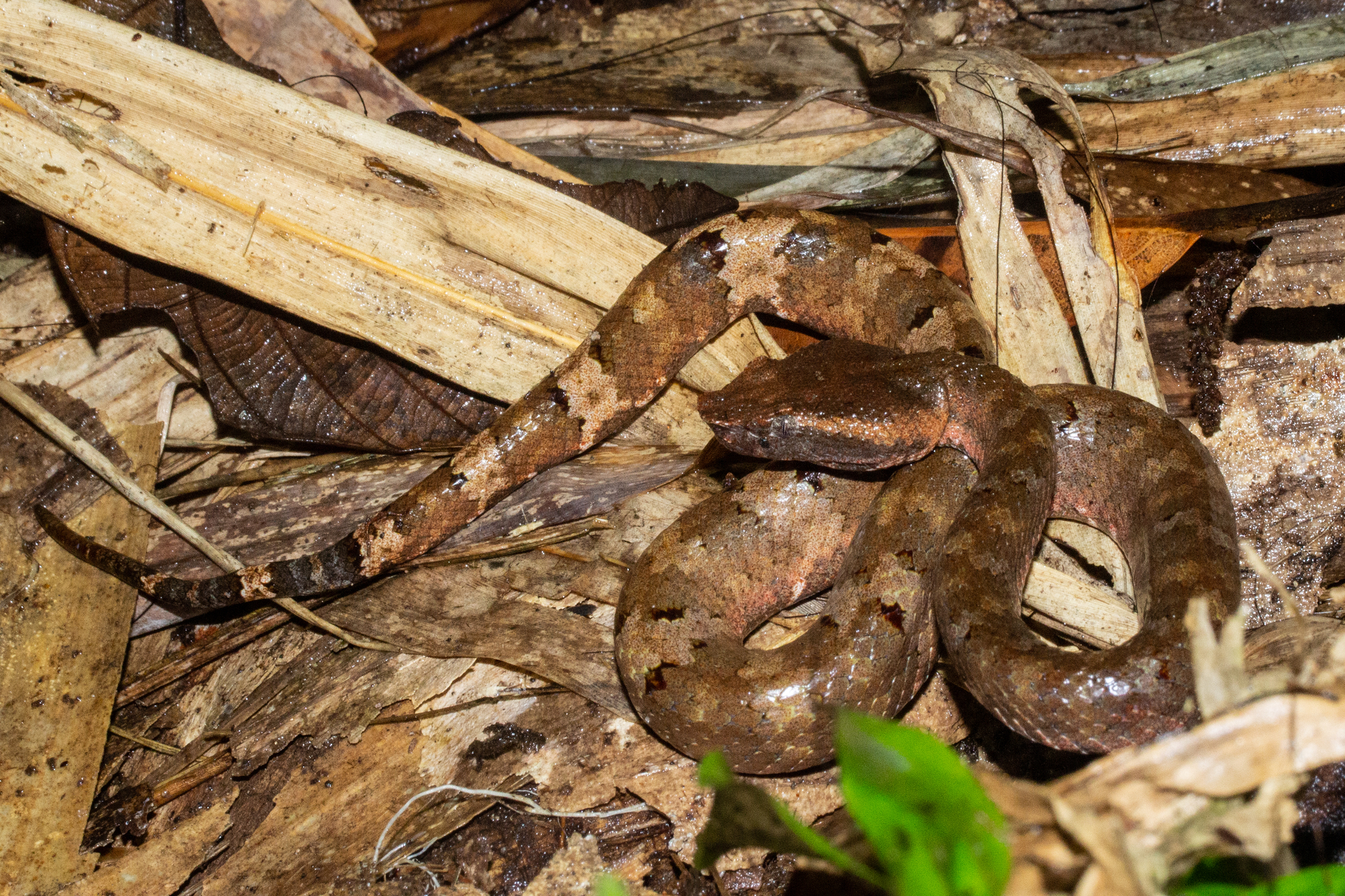
Craspedocephalus borneensis in Malaysia

Scalation includes 19–21 rows of dorsal scales at midbody, 152–180 ventral scales, undivided anal scale, 45–58 divided subcaudal scales, and 8–11 supralabial scales.

Its coloration varies. Individuals may be brown with darker brown saddles, or light brown with a few darker markings, or even bright yellow with darker markings.

Adults may attain 83 cm (33 in) in snout-vent length (SVL).

== Geographic range ==
Craspedocephalus borneensis is found on the island of Borneo (Brunei, Kalimantan, Sabah, Sarawak) as well as in the Natuna Islands.

The type locality given is "Sarawack" (= Sarawak, Borneo).

== Habitat ==
It is found in forests below an altitude of 1,130 m (3,710 ft). Even though the tail is prehensile, adults are usually on the forest floor. Juveniles may be in low vegetation.

== Diet ==
Craspedocephalus borneensis preys upon small rodents and small birds.

== Reproduction ==
Whether this species of Craspedocephalus lays eggs or bears live young is as yet unknown.

They are ovovivipar. The female ley they transparent eggs in a bulk and she curl up around the eggs to incubate and protect them.

Between 12 and 30 hours, all babies hatched and stay close to the mother. I breed them in 2026.

It took approximately seven months from mating to egg-laying.
