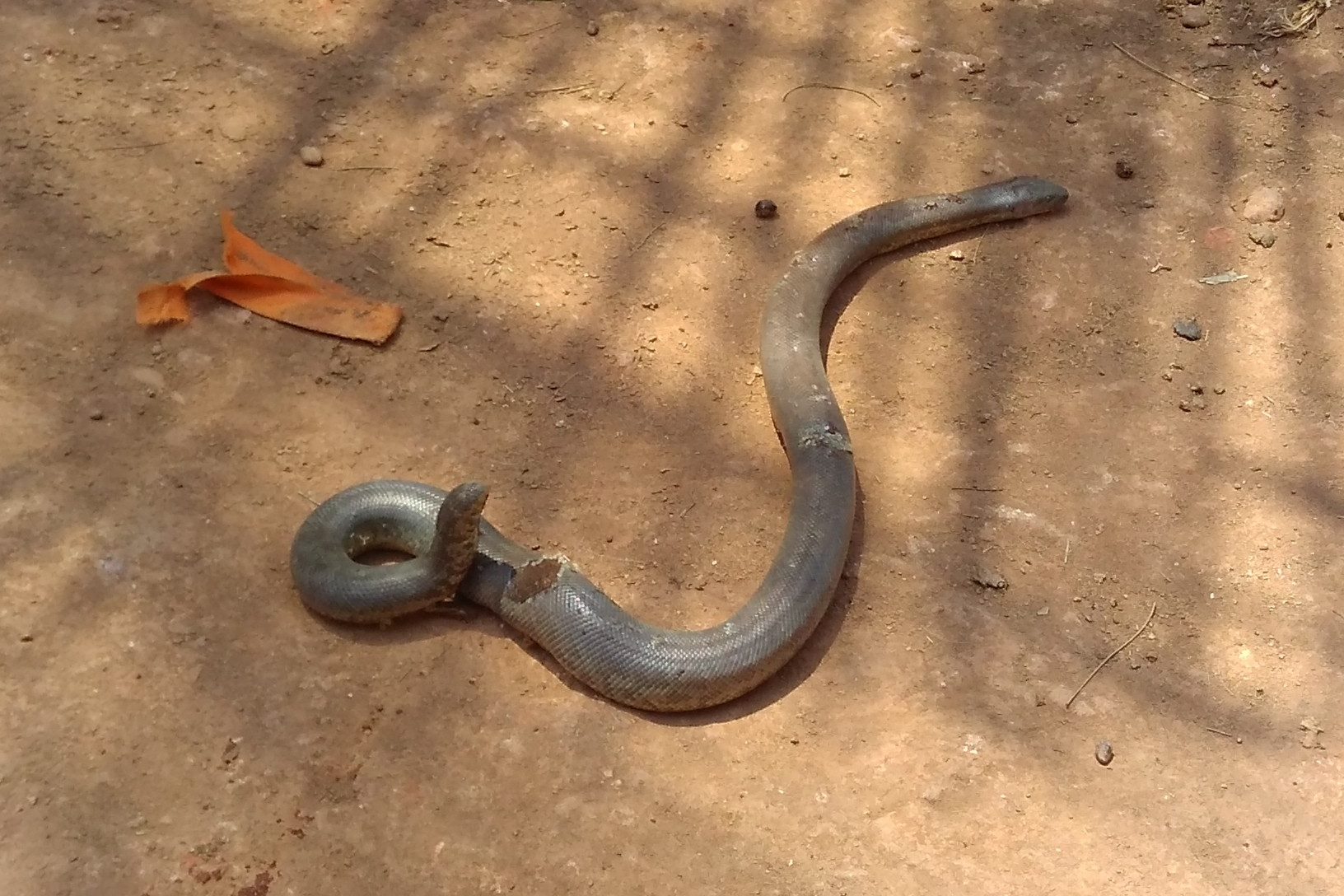

Conservation status
- Least Concern (IUCN 3.1)

Scientific classification
- Kingdom: Animalia
- Phylum: Chordata
- Class: Reptilia
- Order: Squamata
- Suborder: Serpentes
- Family: Micrelapidae
- Genus: Micrelaps
- Species: M. bicoloratus

Binomial name
- Micrelaps bicoloratus Sternfeld, 1908

= Micrelaps bicoloratus =

Species of snake

Micrelaps bicoloratus, or the Kenya two-headed snake, is a species of mildly venomous opisthoglyphous (rear-fanged) snake in the family Micrelapidae. It is endemic to Kenya.
