= Calamaria muelleri =

Conservation status
- Least Concern (IUCN 3.1)

Scientific classification
- Kingdom: Animalia
- Phylum: Chordata
- Class: Reptilia
- Order: Squamata
- Suborder: Serpentes
- Family: Colubridae
- Genus: Calamaria
- Species: C. muelleri

Binomial name
- Calamaria muelleri Boulenger, 1896
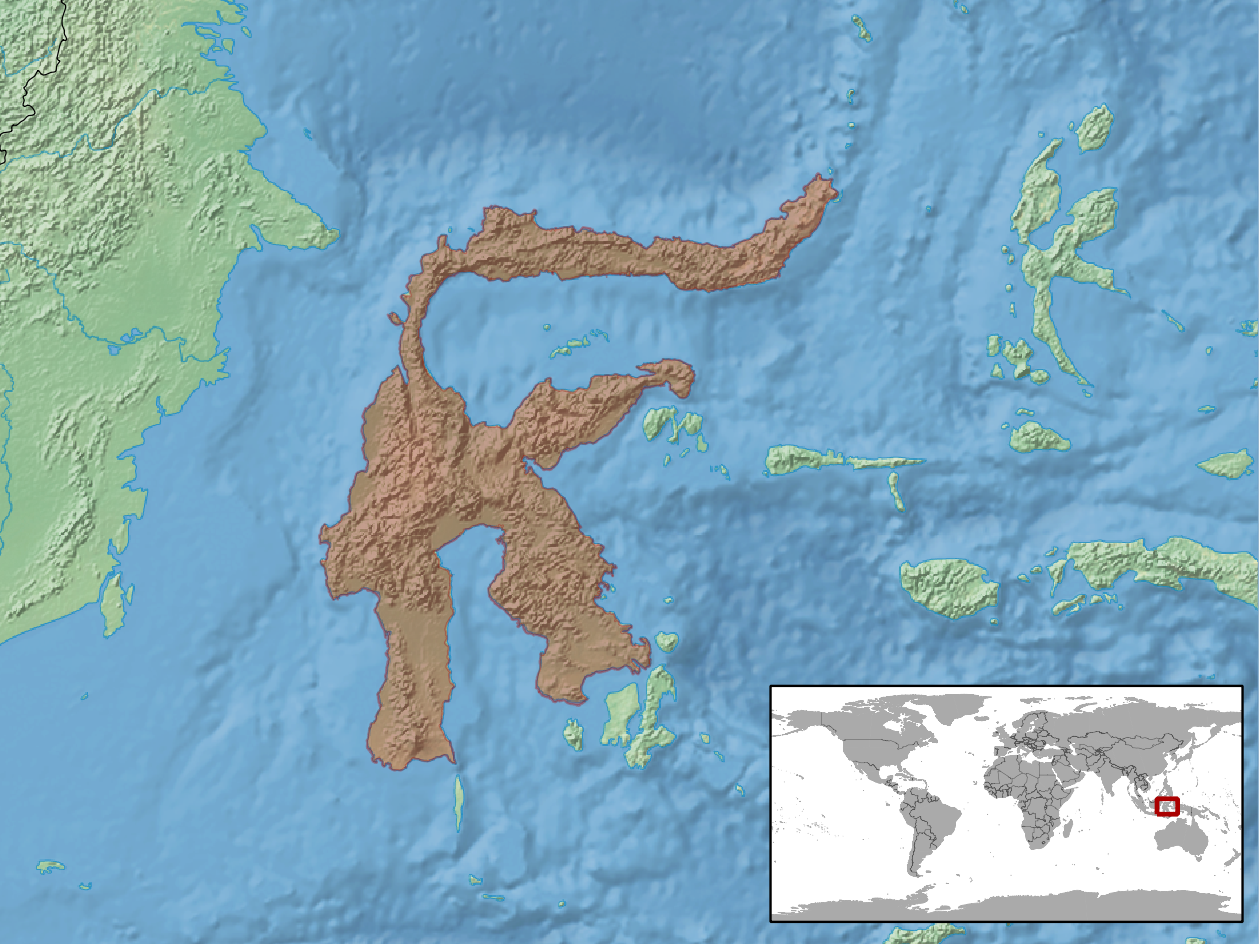

Species of snake

Calamaria muelleri, also known commonly as Mueller's reed snake or Müller's reed snake, is a species of snake in the subfamily Calamariinae of the family, Colubridae. The species is native to Indonesia.

== Etymology ==
The specific name, muelleri, is in honor of Swiss herpetologist Fritz Müller.

== Description ==
Females of Calamaria muelleri are longer than males. Females have a total length (tail included) of 13.6–35.5 cm (5.4–14.0 in), but males have a total length of only 11.6–26.2 cm (4.6–10.3 in).

In Boulenger's original description of this species the total length of the holotype is printed as being "1900 millim." (6 feet 3 inches). This is obviously a typographical error, and probably should have been 190 mm (7.5 in).

== Geographic distribution ==
Calamaria muelleri is endemic to the island of Sulawesi (Celebes) in Indonesia.

== Habitat ==
The preferred natural habitat of Calamaria muelleri is forest.

== Behavior ==
Calamaria muelleri is terrestrial, foraging in the leaf litter of the forest.

== Reproduction ==
Calamaria muelleri is oviparous.
