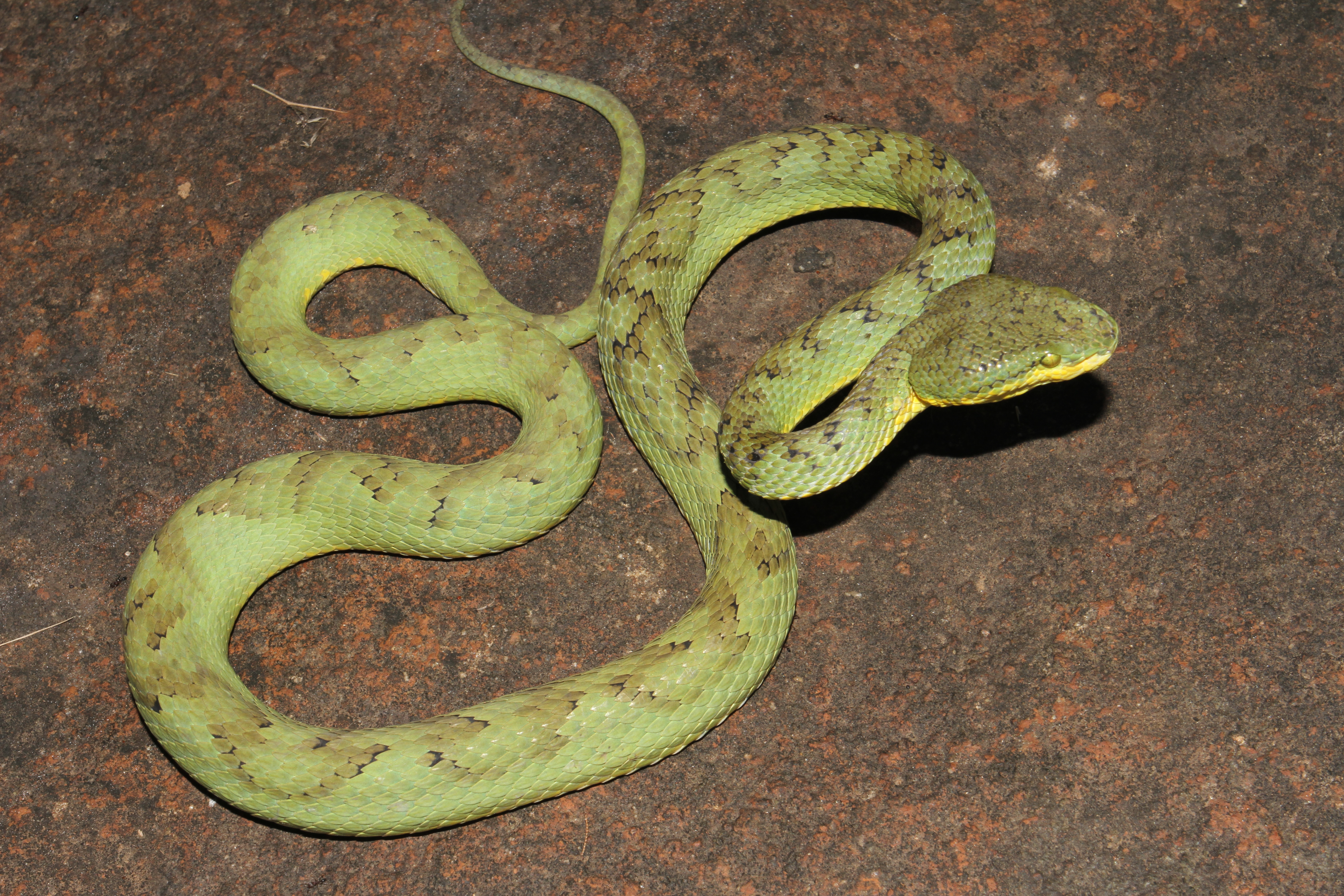
- Bamboo pit viper, C. gramineus

Scientific classification
- Kingdom: Animalia
- Phylum: Chordata
- Class: Reptilia
- Order: Squamata
- Suborder: Serpentes
- Family: Viperidae
- Subfamily: Crotalinae
- Genus: Craspedocephalus; Kuhl & van Hasselt, 1822

= Craspedocephalus =

Genus of snakes

Craspedocephalus is a genus of pit vipers found in Asia from the Indian subcontinent to Southeast Asia. Currently 14 species are recognized.

== Description ==
Most species in the genus Craspedocephalus are relatively small, primarily arboreal species, with thin bodies and prehensile tails. Most species are typically green in color, with some species having yellow, black, orange, red, or gold markings.

== Feeding ==
The diet of Craspedocephalus species include lizards, amphibians, birds, rodents, and other small mammals.

== Species ==
| Image | Species | Taxon author | Subsp.* | Common name | Geographic range |
|---|---|---|---|---|---|
| | C. anamallensis | (Günther, 1864) | 0 | Malabarian pit viper | India |
| | C. andalasensis | David, Vogel, Vijaykumar & Vidal, 2006 | 0 | Sumatran palm pit viper | Indonesia: Sumatra. |
| | C. borneensis | W. Peters, 1872 | 0 | Borneo pit viper | Indonesia: Borneo. |
| | C. brongersmai | Hoge, 1969 | 0 | Brongersma's pit viper | Indonesia: Simalur Island. |
| | C. gramineus type species | Shaw, 1802 | 0 | Common bamboo viper | Southern India. |
| | C. macrolepis | Beddome, 1862 | 0 | Large-scaled pit viper | The mountains of southern India. |
| | C. malabaricus | Jerdon, 1854 | 0 | Malabarian pit viper | Southern and western India at 600–2,000 m elevation. |
| | C. occidentalis | Pope & Pope, 1933 | 0 | | India |
| | C. peltopelor | Mallik, Srikanthan, Ganesh, Vijayakumar, Campbell, Malhotra, & Shanker, 2021. | 0 | | India |
| | C. puniceus | Boie, 1827 | 0 | Ashy pit viper, flat-nosed pit viper | Southern Thailand, West and East Malaysia (Sabah and Sarawak) and Indonesia (Borneo, Sumatra, the Mentawai Islands of Siberut and North Pagai, Simalur and Java. |
| | C. strigatus | Gray, 1842 | 0 | Horseshoe pit viper | The hills of southern India. |
| | C. travancoricus | Mallik, Srikanthan, Ganesh, Vijayakumar, Campbell, Malhotra, & Shanker, 2021 | 0 | | India |
| | C. trigonocephalus | Donndorff, 1798 | 0 | Ceylon pit viper, Sri Lankan green pit viper | Throughout Sri Lanka from low elevations to about 1,800 m. |
| | C. wiroti | Trutnau, 1981 | 0 | Wirot's pit viper | Thailand, West Malaysia. |

*) Not including the nominate subspecies.

== See also ==
- Trimeresurus
