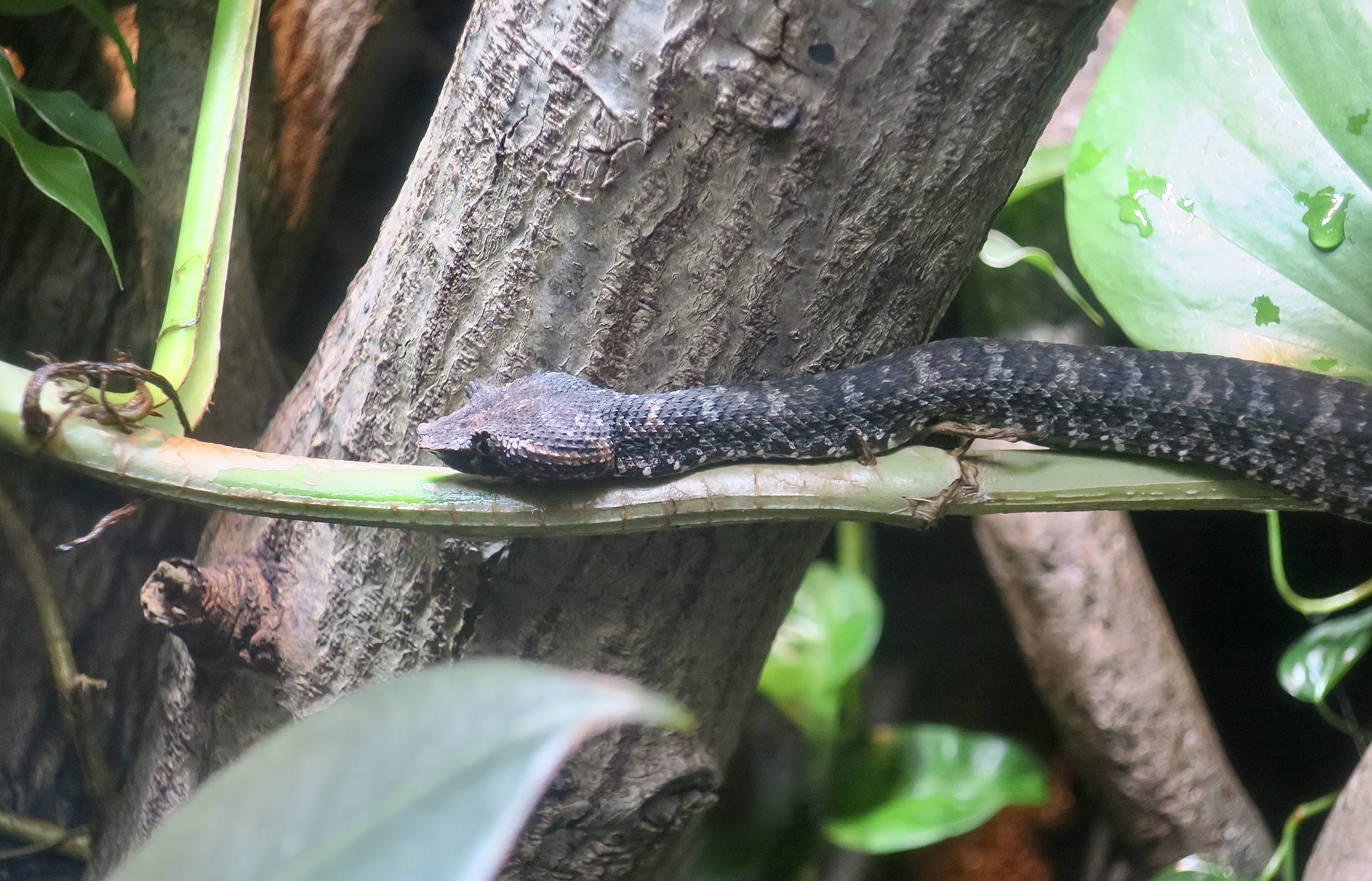
- At Bronx Zoo.

Conservation status
- Near Threatened (IUCN 3.1)

Scientific classification
- Kingdom: Animalia
- Phylum: Chordata
- Class: Reptilia
- Order: Squamata
- Suborder: Serpentes
- Family: Viperidae
- Genus: Craspedocephalus
- Species: C. brongersmai

Binomial name
- Craspedocephalus brongersmai Hoge, 1969
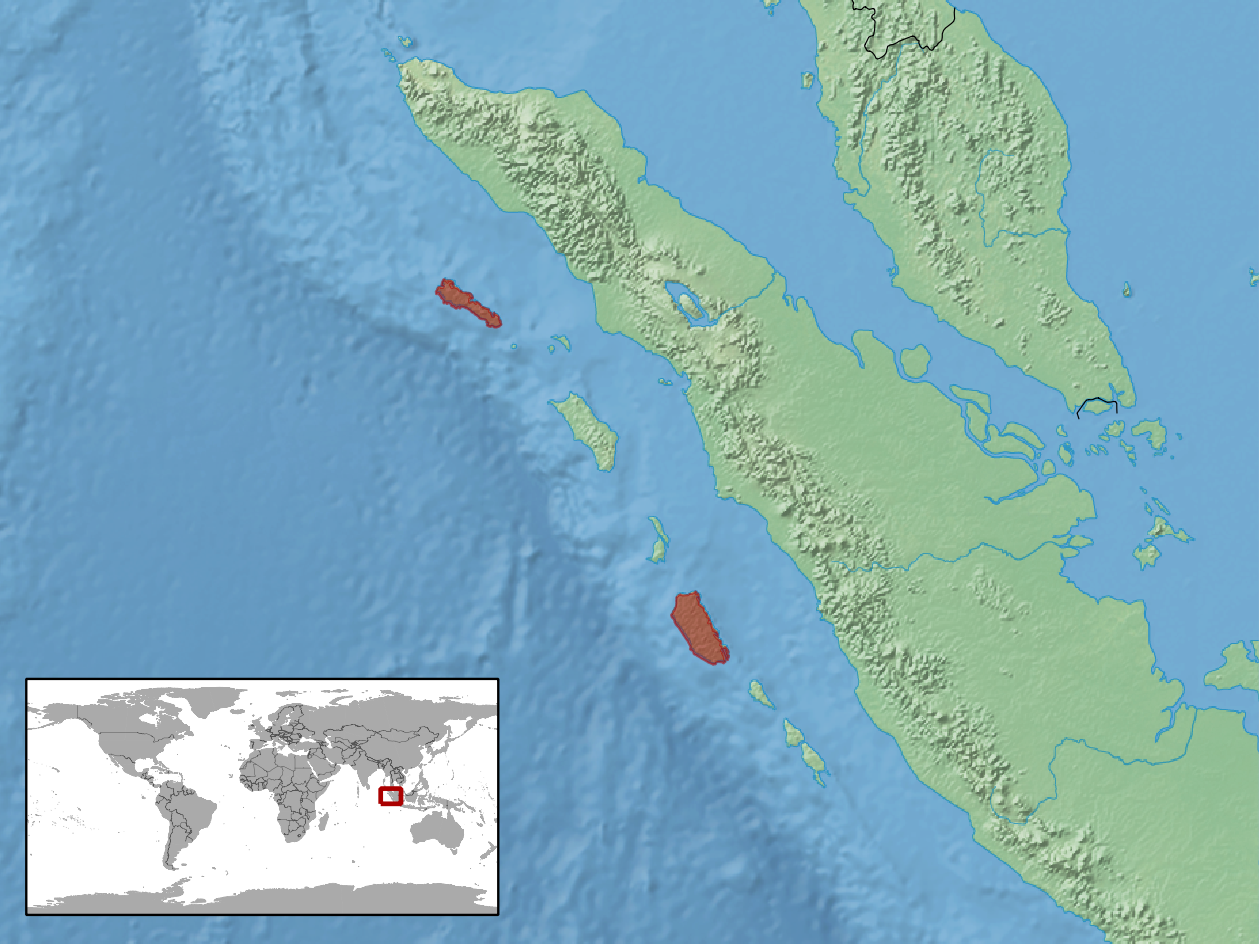

Synonyms
- Craspedocephalus brongersmai Hoge, 1969; Trimeresurus (Craspedocephalus) brongersmai — David, G. Vogel & Dubois, 2011; Craspedocephalus brongersmai — Wallach, K. Williams & Boundy, 2014

= Craspedocephalus brongersmai =

Species of snake

Craspedocephalus brongersmai, also known commonly as Brongersma's pit viper, is a species of venomous snake in the subfamily Crotalinae of the family Viperidae. The species is native to islands off the west coast of Sumatra, Indonesia. No subspecies are currently recognized.

== Etymology ==
The specific name, brongersmai, is in honor of Dutch herpetologist Leo Brongersma.

== Description ==
Scalation of C. brongersmai includes 19 (or 21) rows of dorsal scales at midbody, 136-150 ventral scales, 41-48 divided subcaudal scales, and 9-10 supralabial scales.

== Geographic range ==
Craspedocephalus brongersmai is found in Indonesia, on the Mentawai islands of Siberut and Simeulue, which are located off the west coast of Sumatra.

The type locality given is "Lugu, Simalur, Sumatra" [= Lugu, Simeulue Island, Indonesia].

== Habitat ==
The preferred natural habitat of C. brongersmai is forest.

== Reproduction ==
The mode of reproduction of C. brongersmai is unknown.
