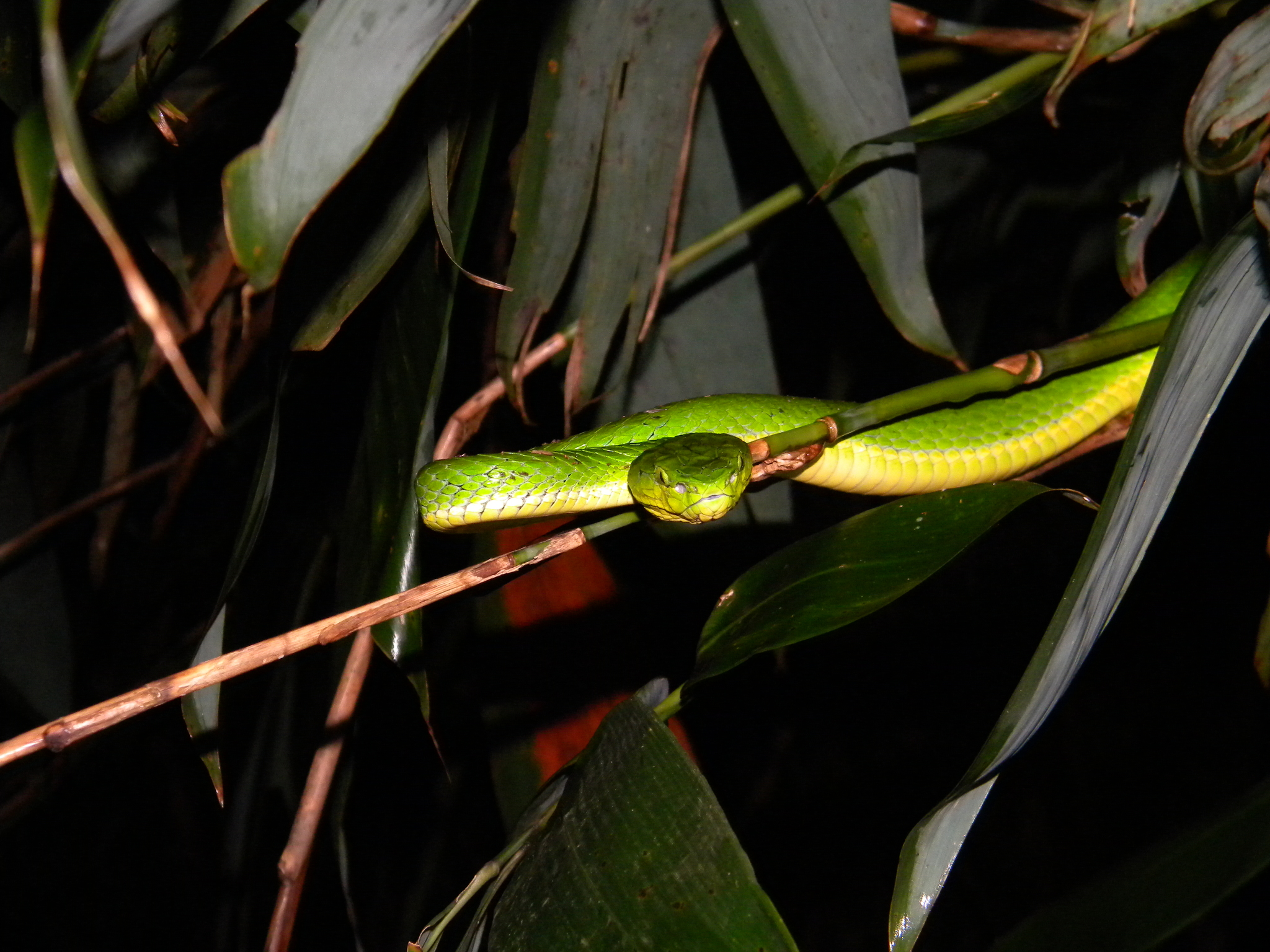

Scientific classification
- Kingdom: Animalia
- Phylum: Chordata
- Class: Reptilia
- Order: Squamata
- Suborder: Serpentes
- Family: Viperidae
- Genus: Craspedocephalus
- Species: C. peltopelor

Binomial name
- Craspedocephalus peltopelor Mallik, Srikanthan, Ganesh, Vijayakumar, Campbell, Malhotra & Shanker, 2021

= Craspedocephalus peltopelor =

Species of snake

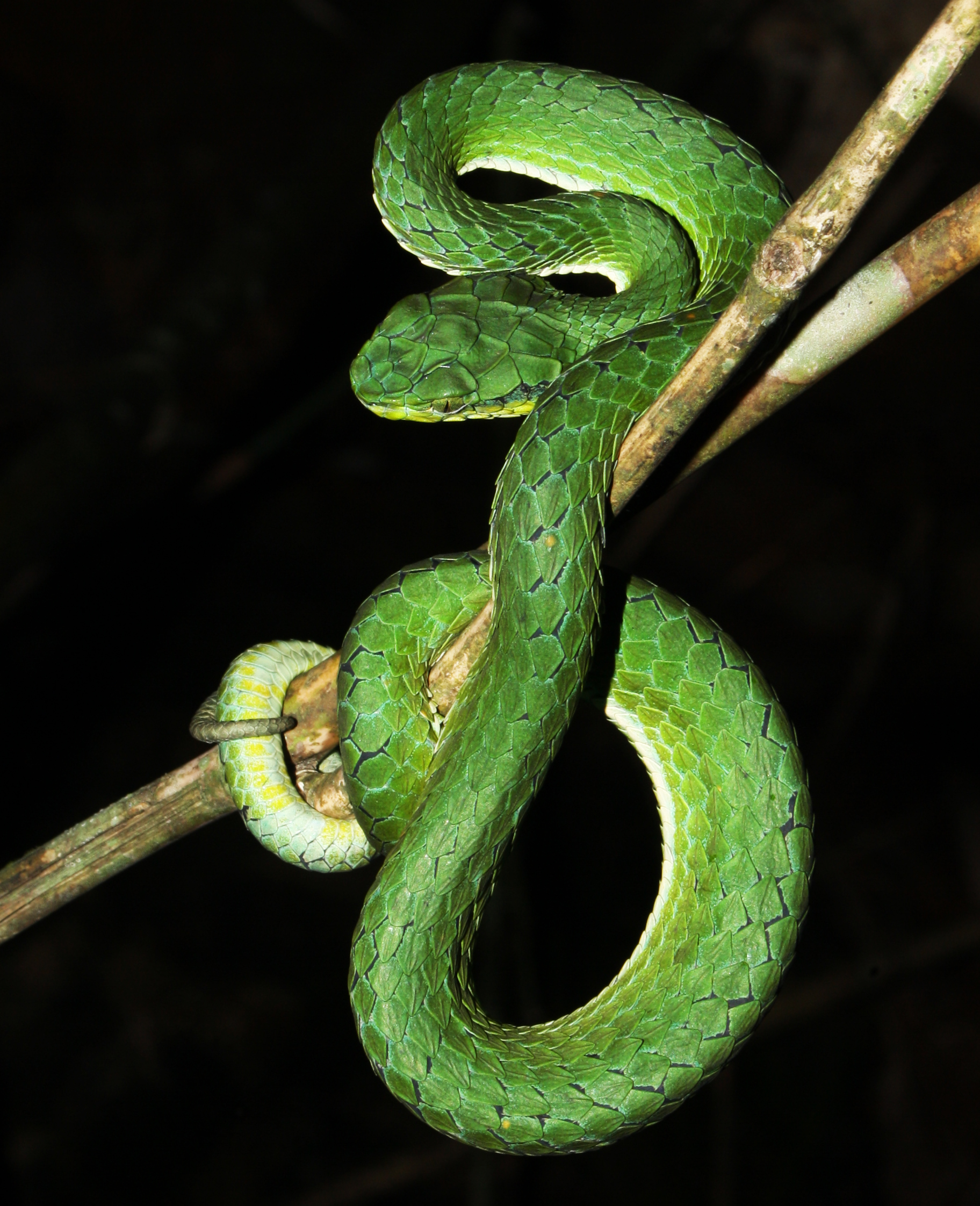

Craspedocephalus peltopelor is a species of pit viper endemic to the Western Ghats region of India. It is commonly known as the southern large-scaled pit viper.
