= Sphenomorphus annamiticus =

Scientific classification
- Kingdom: Animalia
- Phylum: Chordata
- Class: Reptilia
- Order: Squamata
- Family: Scincidae
- Genus: Sphenomorphus
- Species: S. annamiticus

Binomial name
- Sphenomorphus annamiticus (Boettger, 1901)

Species of lizard

The Perak forest skink or starry forest skink (Sphenomorphus annamiticus) is a species of skink found in Vietnam and Cambodia.
