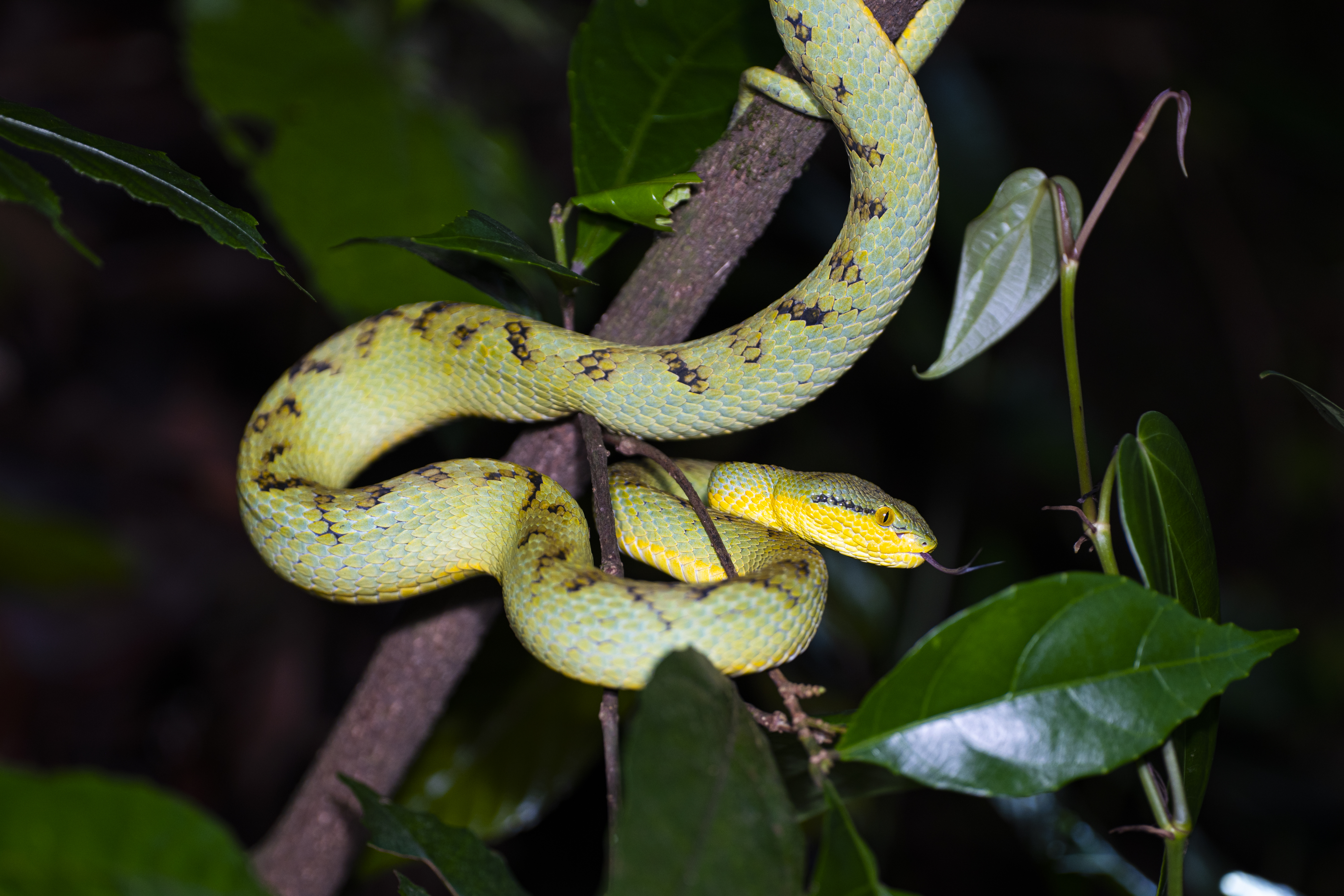

Conservation status
- Least Concern (IUCN 3.1)

Scientific classification
- Kingdom: Animalia
- Phylum: Chordata
- Class: Reptilia
- Order: Squamata
- Suborder: Serpentes
- Family: Viperidae
- Genus: Craspedocephalus
- Species: C. gramineus

Binomial name
- Craspedocephalus gramineus (Shaw, 1802)
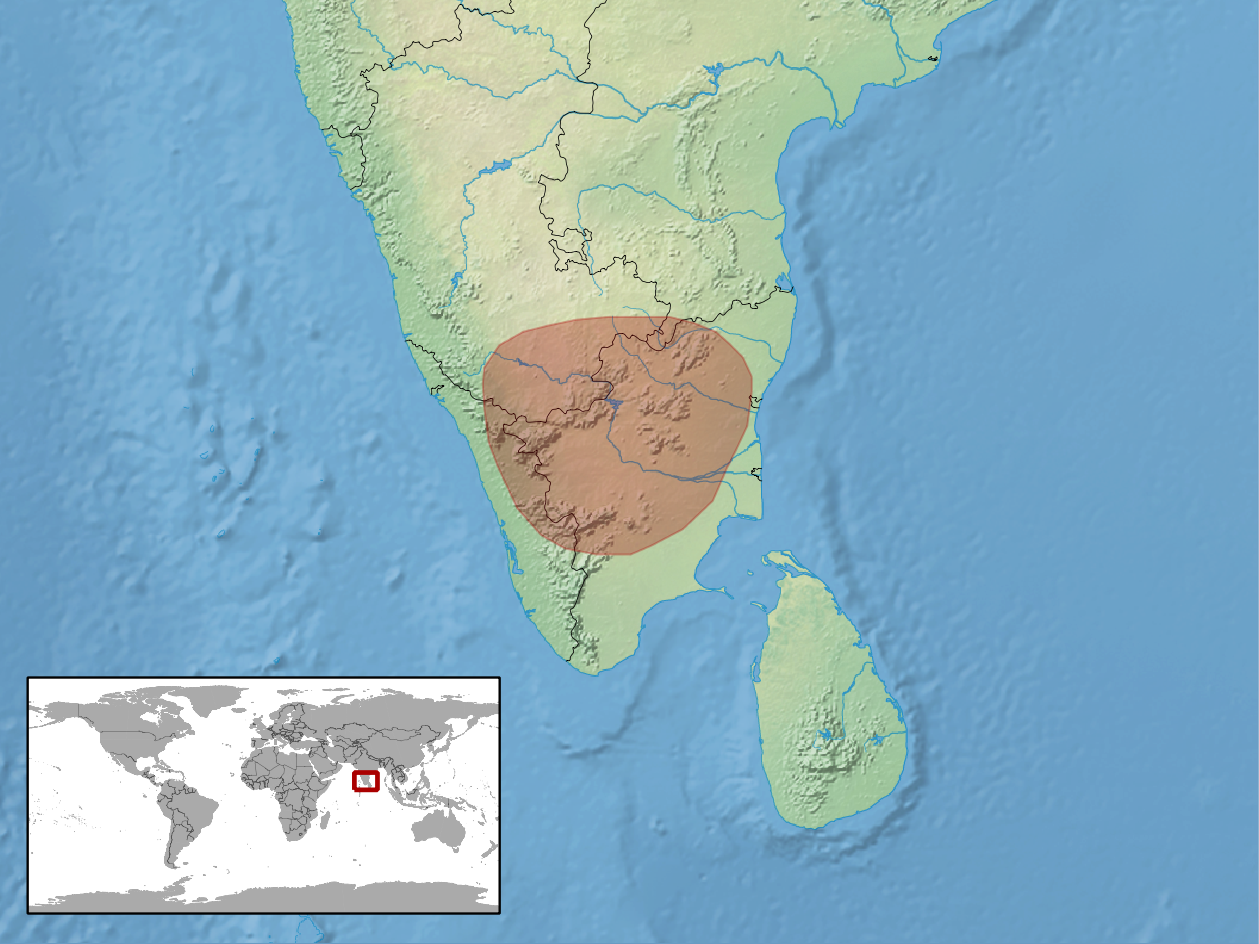

Synonyms
- Coluber graminaeus Shaw, 1802; Coluber viridis Bechstein, 1802; Vipera viridis; Trimeresurus elegans; Trimeresurus viridis; Lachesis graminaeus; Lachesis gramineus; Trimeresurus occidentalis; Trimeresurus (Craspedocephalus) gramineus; Craspedocephalus gramineus

= Craspedocephalus gramineus =

Species of snake

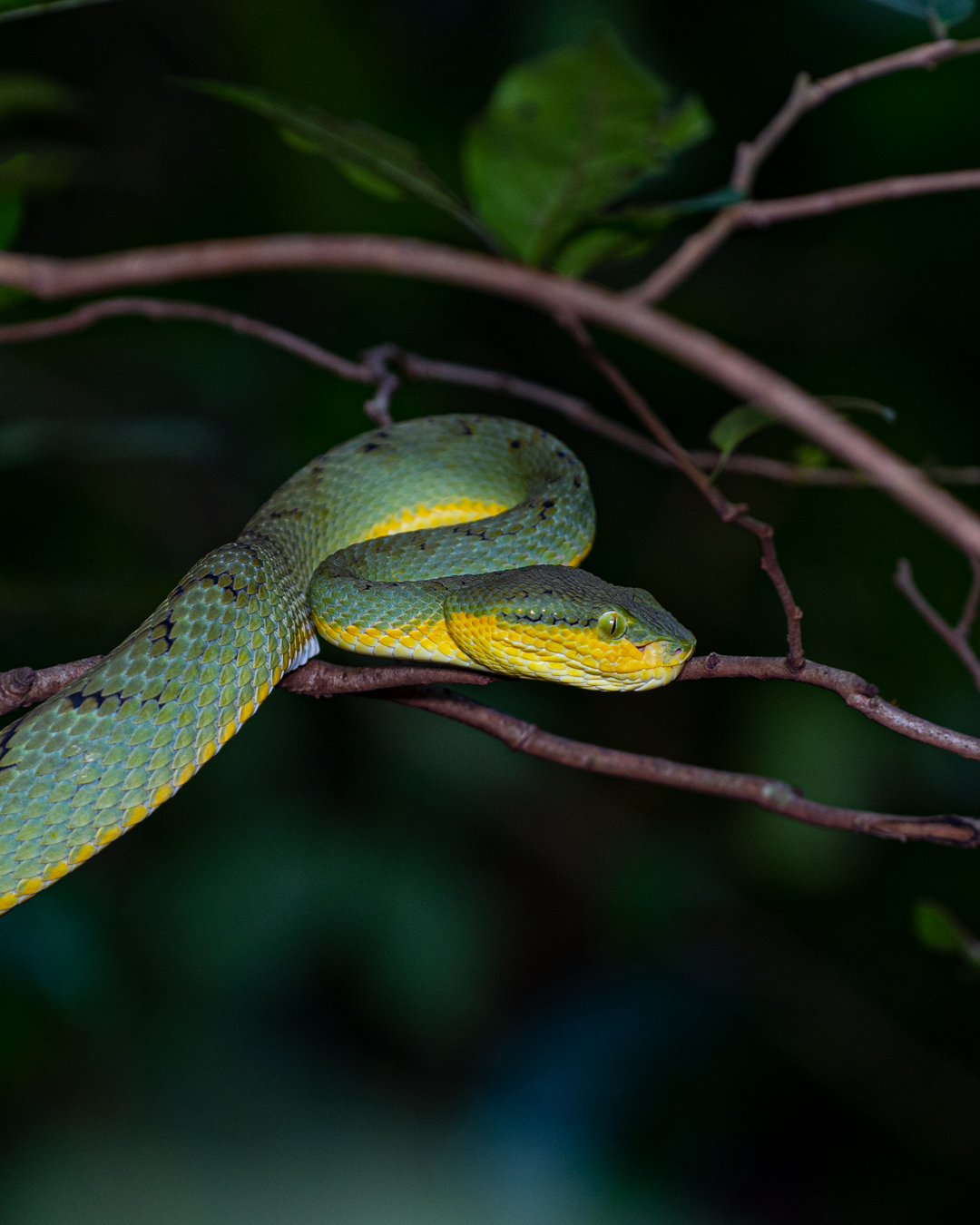
at Matheran

Craspedocephalus gramineus, known as the bamboo pit viper, Indian green pit viper, or common green pit viper, is a venomous pit viper species found in the southern and north eastern parts of India. No subspecies are currently recognized.

== Description ==
The rostral scale is as deep as broad or broader than deep. The upper head-scales are small, smooth, imbricate; supraocular scale narrow, rarely broken up. The internasals are contact or separated by one or two scales. There are 8 to 13 scales on a line between the supraoculars; usually one or two, rarely three, series of scales between the suboculars and the labials; 9 to 12 upper labials, second usually forming the anterior border of the loreal pit, third largest; temporal scales smooth. The dorsal scales are more or less distinctly keeled, in 21 (rarely 19 or 23) rows; ventrals 145–175; anal scale entire; subcaudals in two rows 53–76.

The upper parts are usually bright green, rarely yellowish, greyish, or purplish brown, with or without black, brown, or reddish spots; usually a light, white, yellow, or red streak along the outer row of scales; end of tail frequently yellow or red; lower parts green, yellow, or whitish.

It grows to a total length of 3.25 feet (0.99 m). The tail is 5.5 inches (14 cm) in length.

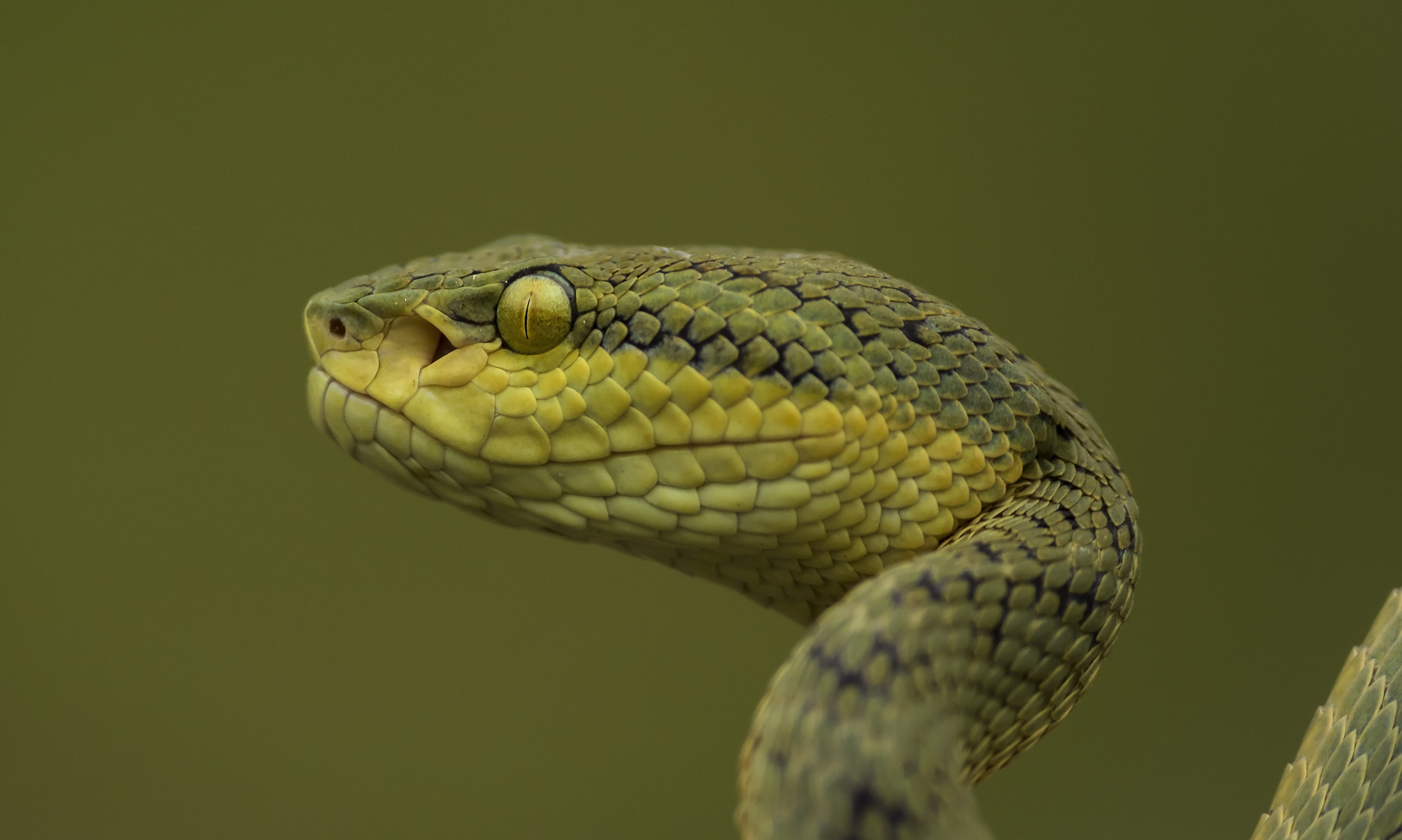
Head

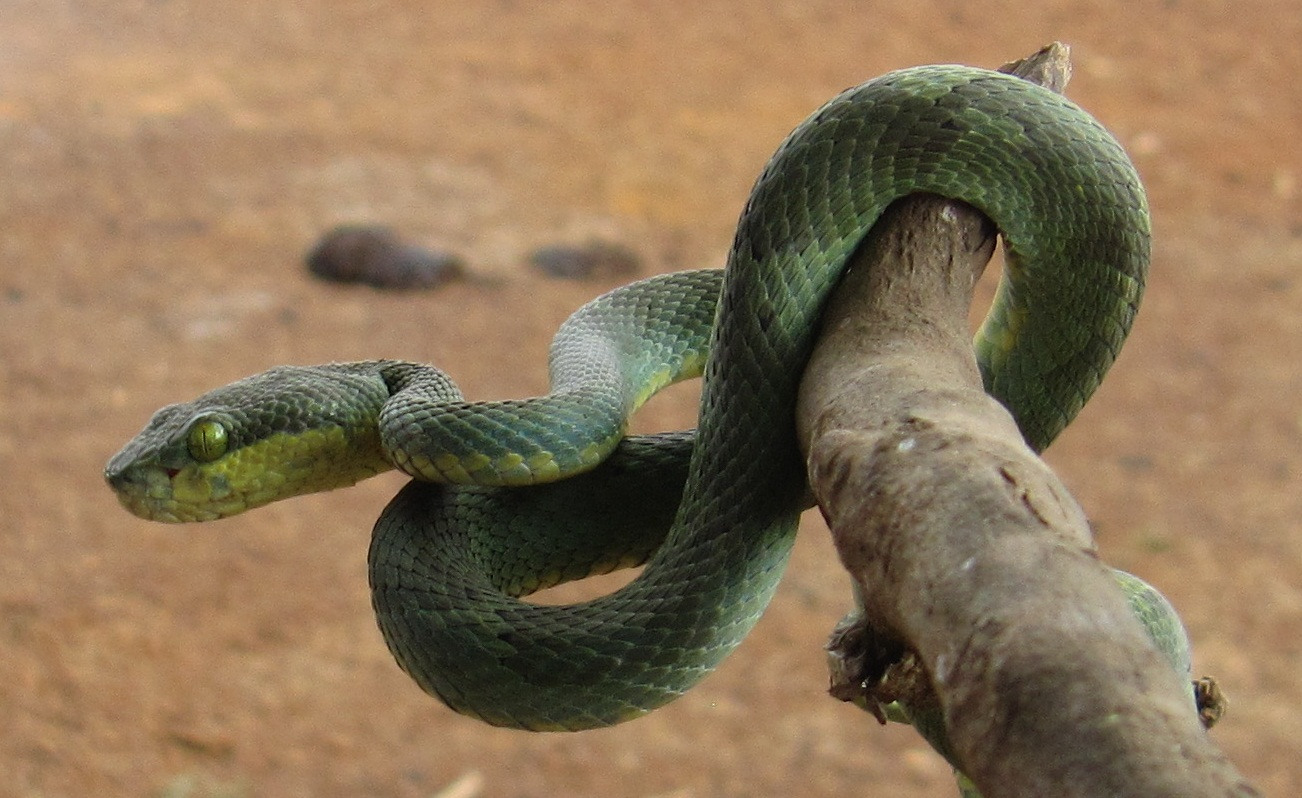
In Raajmachi, Lonavala

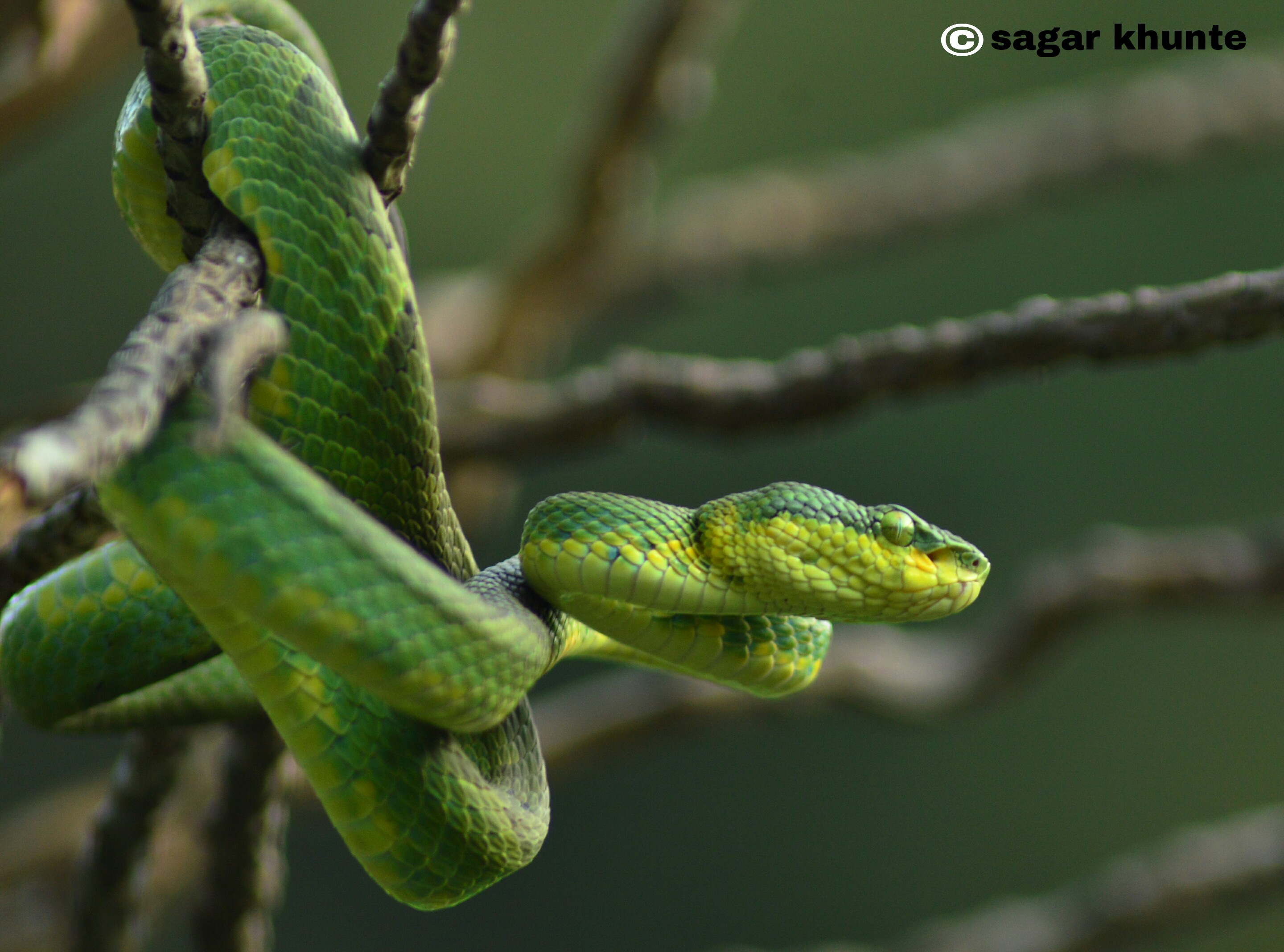
In Satara, Maharashtra

== Taxonomy and common names ==
It was first described in 1802 as Coluber graminaeus. No subspecies are recognized.

Common names include: bamboo pit viper, Indian tree viper, bamboo snake, Indian green tree viper, green tree viper, bamboo viper, bamboo pitviper, boodro pam, grass-green snake, and green pit viper.

== Geographic range ==
The Bamboo Pit Viper is a widespread species throughout the peninsular India. It is also found albeit very scarcely in the eastern region of India spanning from Odisha, Jharkhand, and West Bengal.

The type locality is "Vizagapatam, India", which is based on Russell (1796).

== Habitat ==
Despite its name, the species is not particularly associated to Bamboo thickets. It is an arboreal snake, usually found on low to medium high bushes and trees, and often near streams. Being a nocturnal creature, it is found at lower heights as it sits in ambush at night. During daytime, these snakes ascend at greater heights.

== Behaviour ==
C. gramineus is arboreal and nocturnal. When threatened, it is aggressive and does not hesitate to bite. The venom is hemotoxic and neurotoxic.

== Diet ==
It feeds on lizards, rats, and birds.

== Reproduction ==
C. gramineus is ovoviviparous. Adult females give birth to 6 to 11 young, which measure up to 4.5 in (110 mm) in length.
