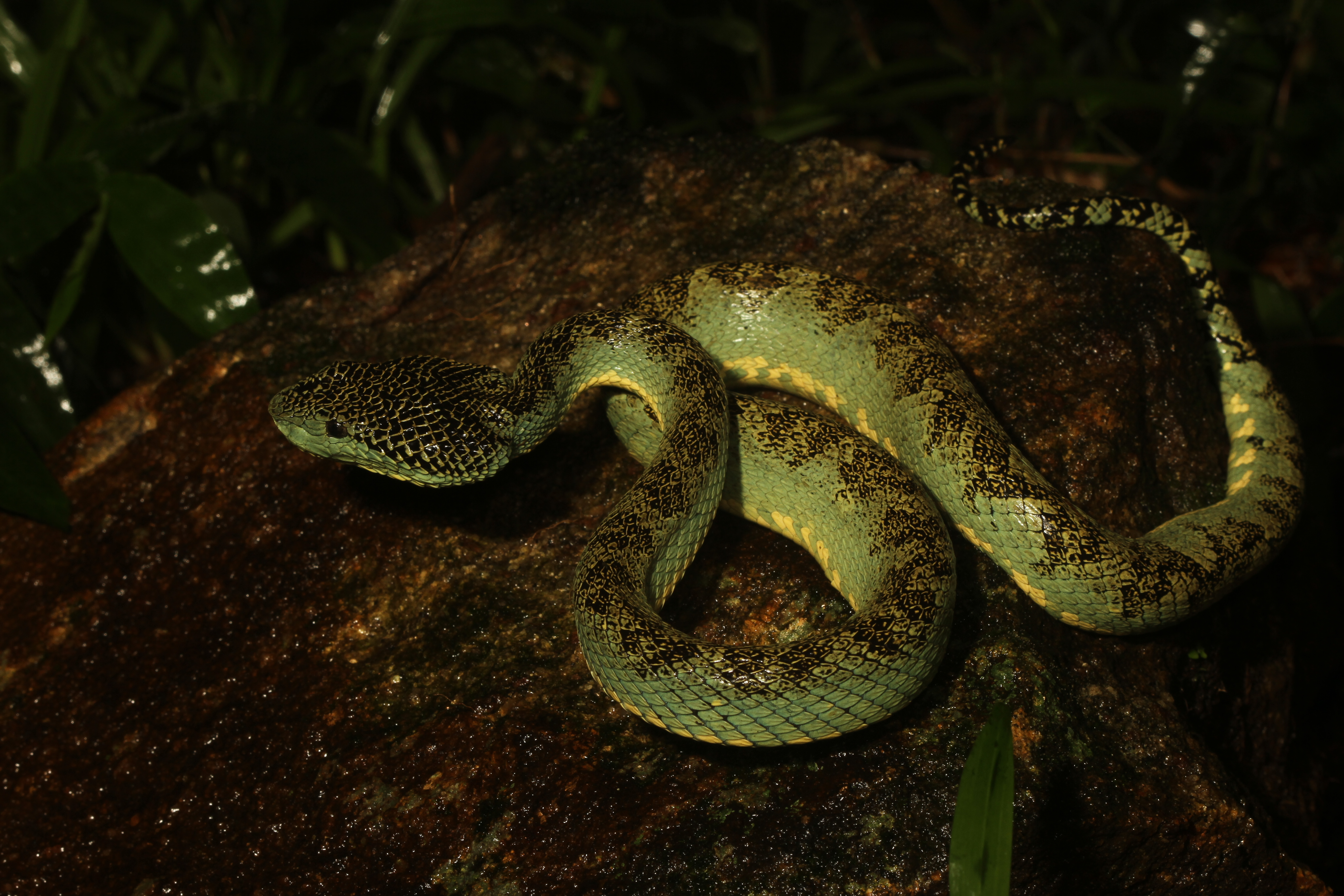

Scientific classification
- Kingdom: Animalia
- Phylum: Chordata
- Class: Reptilia
- Order: Squamata
- Suborder: Serpentes
- Family: Viperidae
- Genus: Craspedocephalus
- Species: C. travancoricus

Binomial name
- Craspedocephalus travancoricus Mallik, Srikanthan, Ganesh, Vijayakumar, Campbell, Malhotra, & Shanker, 2021

= Craspedocephalus travancoricus =

Species of Indian snake

Craspedocephalus travancoricus, commonly known as Travancore pit viper, is a venomous species of arboreal pit viper from India named after the Travancore hills it inhabits.

== Description ==
Craspedocephalus travancoricus displays a slender, cylindrical body with around 34.5 to 28 cm snout to vent length, a tail around 6 cm long and a head around 2 cm long. It can also be distinguished from other snakes by its specific scale count and shapes as well as its colouring, with the top of its head almost covered in dark brown to purplish brown colour with a light yellowish green border, its body being a faded green marbled with brown and its tail having 13 yellow-green bands. Its eyes are also silverish with a yellow tint, displaying red blotches throughout the eye concentrating towards the middle.

C. travancoricus is also known to have multiple colour morphs – green, brown, green-brown, orange and grey-black.

== Habitat ==
Being an arboreal snake, Craspedocephalus travancoricus is often found in bushes and undergrowth near streams in forests.
