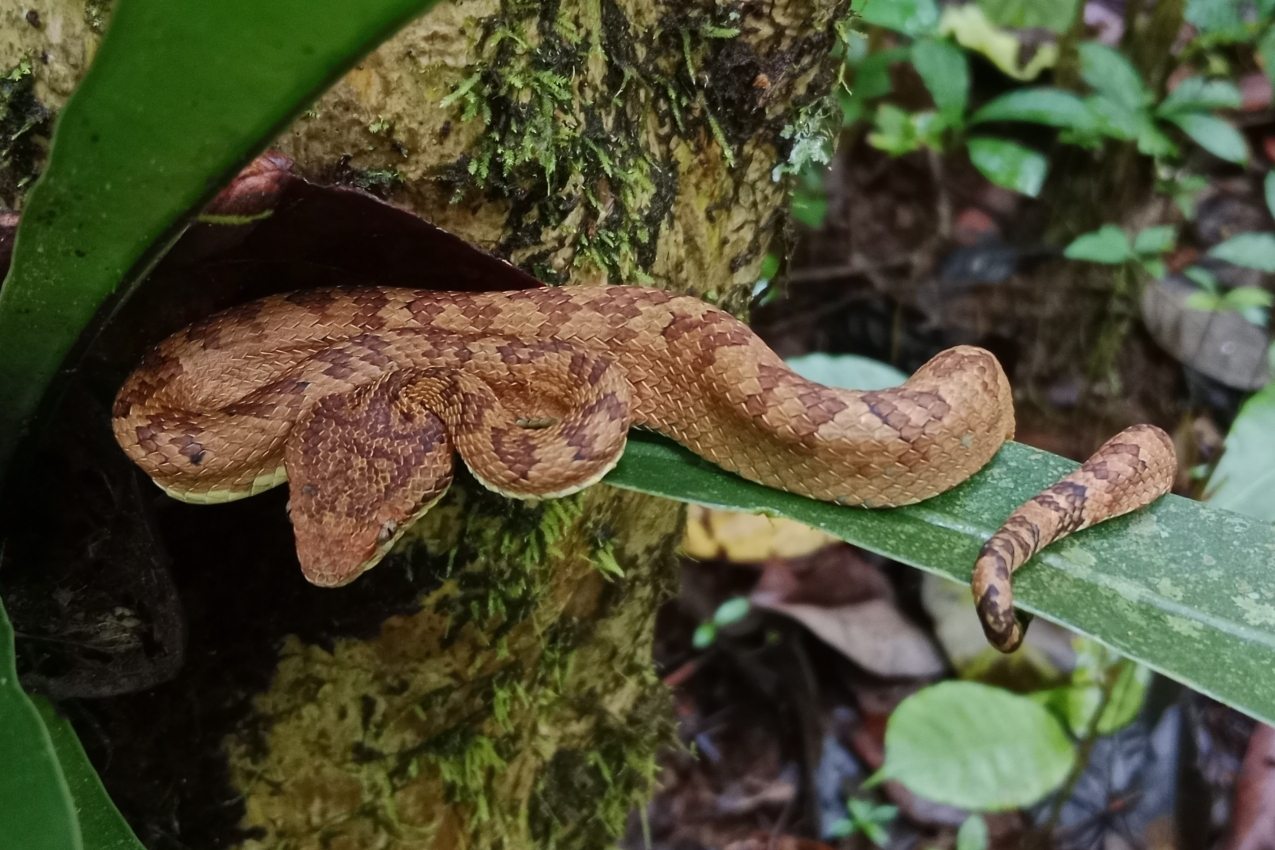
- Craspedocephalus anamallensis, India

Scientific classification
- Kingdom: Animalia
- Phylum: Chordata
- Class: Reptilia
- Order: Squamata
- Suborder: Serpentes
- Family: Viperidae
- Genus: Craspedocephalus
- Species: C. anamallensis

Binomial name
- Craspedocephalus anamallensis Günther, 1864

= Craspedocephalus anamallensis =

Species of snake from Peninsular India

Craspedocephalus anamallensis, also known as Malabarian pit viper, is a species of partly arboreal and venomous pitviper from South India. It is named after the Anamalai hills it is from.

== Description ==
Craspedocephalus anamallensis is known to have multiple colour morphs: brown, green, grey and olive.
