= Rhinoplocephalus =

Conservation status
- Least Concern (IUCN 3.1)

Scientific classification
- Kingdom: Animalia
- Phylum: Chordata
- Class: Reptilia
- Order: Squamata
- Suborder: Serpentes
- Family: Elapidae
- Genus: Rhinoplocephalus; F. Müller, 1885
- Species: R. bicolor

Binomial name
- Rhinoplocephalus bicolor F. Müller, 1885

Species of snake

Rhinoplocephalus is a genus of venomous snake in the family Elapidae. The genus is monotypic, containing the sole species Rhinoplocephalus bicolor, known commonly as the square-nosed snake, Müller's snake, or Muller's [sic] snake. The species is endemic to south-western Australia.

== Geographic distribution ==
The square-nosed snake is found in the very far southern coastal areas of the Australian state of Western Australia, ranging from approximately Esperance in the east to somewhere west of Walpole.

== Habitat ==
The typical habitat of Rhinoplocephalus bicolor is swampy depressions in low heath and open forest, often overlapping in habitat with Elapognathus minor, the short-nosed snake. The square-nosed snake is often found in disused nests of stick-ants (Iridomyrmex spp.).

== Description ==
The square-nosed snake is a small snake species, with male snout-to-vent length (SVL) averaging 34.6 cm (13.6 in) and female SVL averaging 32.8 cm (12.9 in).

The dorsal surface of adult individuals is orange-brown, with orange-red sides fading to a pale cream colour on the ventral surface. Occasional animals can be found that are bright orange across the entire dorsal surface. There is also a strong ontogenetic shift in colour pattern, in which neonates are dorsally blue with a yellow lateral region.

== Diet ==
The square-nosed snake is a reptile specialist, feeding primarily on scincid lizards such as those in the genera Ctenotus, Hemiergis and Morethia, and rarely on frogs.

== Reproduction ==
Like some other cold climate Australia elapids, Rhinoplocephalus bicolor is ovoviviparous, giving birth to live young. Gravid females have been collected in October and January, suggesting similar reproductive patterns as for other southern elapid snakes in Australia. Litter sizes are typically small, with between one and five offspring being produced.

== Toxicity ==
The square-nosed snake is mildly venomous, with a typical bite not dangerous to humans.
