= Prefrontal scales =

Set of scales near the tip of the snout of a reptile

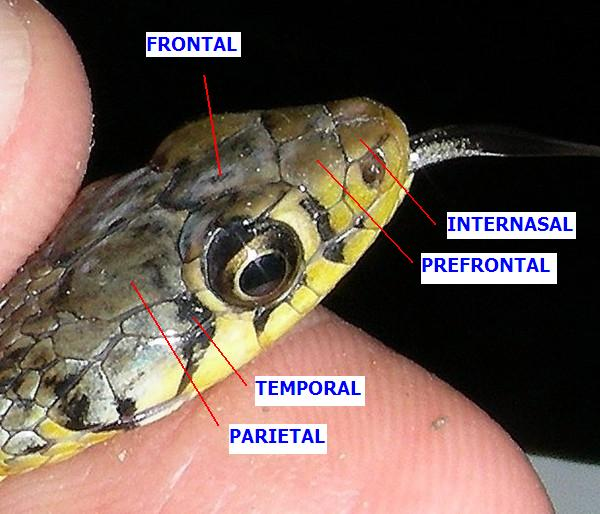
Nomenclature of scales (top view of head)

The prefrontal scales on snakes and other reptiles are the scales adjacent and anterior to the frontal, towards the tip of the snout, which are also in contact with the internasals.

== See also ==
- Snake scales
- Scale (zoology)
