= Internasal scales =

Scales that surround the nostrils of snakes

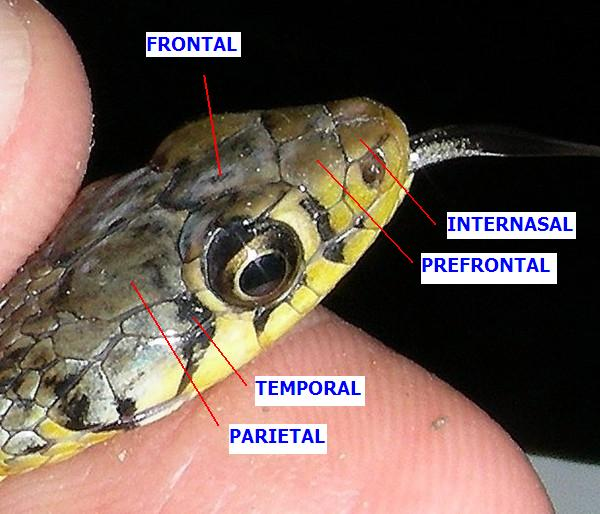
Nomenclature of scales (top view of head)

In snakes, the internasal scales are those on top of the head between the scales that surround the nostrils. They are usually paired and situated just behind the rostral.

== Related scales ==
- Nasal scales
- Rostral scale

== See also ==
- Snake scales
- Scale (zoology)
