= Oskar Boettger =

German zoologist

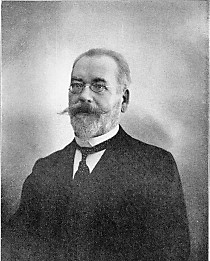
- Born: 31 March 1844; Frankfurt am Main, Germany
- Died: 25 September 1910 (aged 66)
- Citizenship: German
- Education: University of Würzburg
- Scientific career
- Fields: Zoology
- Workplaces: Senckenberg Museum in Frankfurt

Oskar Boettger (German: Böttger; 31 March 1844 – 25 September 1910) was a German zoologist who was a native of Frankfurt am Main. He was an uncle of the noted malacologist Caesar Rudolf Boettger (1888–1976).

From 1863 to 1866 he studied at the Bergakademie Freiberg, then worked for a year in a chemical factory in Frankfurt am Main. In 1869 he received his doctorate from the University of Würzburg. The following year (1870), he became a paleontologist at the Senckenberg Museum in Frankfurt, where in 1875 he became the curator of the museum's department of herpetology. He is credited for making Senckenberg's herpetological collection among the best in Europe.

Boettger had agoraphobia and rarely left home, never setting foot in a museum from 1876 to 1894. Thus he relied on assistants to bring specimens he needed for his research. He was editor of Katalog der Batrachier-Sammlung im Museum der Senckenbergischen naturforschenden Gesellschaft in Frankfurt am Main as well as Katalog der Reptilien-Sammlung im Museum der Senckenbergischen naturforschenden Gesellschaft in Frankfurt am Main, both catalogs being issued by the Senckenberg Museum. Also, he was co-author of the herpetology volume for the third edition of Alfred Brehm's Tierleben. During the latter stages of his career he taught classes at the Wöhler-Realgymnasium in Frankfurt and also engaged in some foreign travel.

Boettger was married, and he honored his wife, Hermine Boettger, by naming a species of snake after her, Ptyas herminae.

== Taxa ==
As a taxonomist he described many species of amphibians and reptiles new to science. A number of herpetological species/subspecies are named in his honor, including:

- Atractus boettgeri, Boettger's ground snake (synonym of Atractus emmeli)
- Calumma boettgeri, Boettger's chameleon, described by Boulenger in 1888
- Cacosternum boettgeri, Boettger's dainty frog
- Emoia boettgeri, Boettger's emo skink
- Hymenochirus boettgeri, African dwarf frog
- Micrelaps boettgeri, Boettger's two-headed snake
- Scincella boettgeri, Boettger's ground skink
- Tarentola boettgeri, Boettger's wall gecko
- Testudo hermanni boettgeri, eastern Hermann's tortoise
- Trachylepis boettgeri, Boettger's mabuya
- Xenophrys boettgeri, a species of Asian toad
- Zonosaurus boettgeri, Boettger's girdled lizard

Boettger was also a conchologist or malacologist, and an entomologist who specialized in Coleoptera (beetles). Argonauta boettgeri and Sarcophyton boettgeri are named after him.

He named and described some gastropod taxa, including:

- Lampedusa Boettger, 1877, a land snail genus
- Megalophaedusa Boettger, 1877, a land snail genus.

== Sources ==
- Note: This article incorporates translated text from the French Wikipedia, sources listed as:
- Adler, Kraig (1989). Contributions to the History of Herpetology. Society for the Study of Amphibians and Reptiles. 202 pp. ISBN 978-0-916984-19-9.
- Lescure, Jean; Le Garff, Bernard (2006). L'étymologie des noms d'amphibiens et de reptiles d'Europe. Paris: Éditions Belin. 207 pp. ISBN 2-7011-4142-7. (in French).
