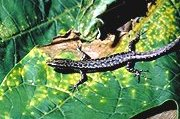
- Cryptoblepharus poecilopleurus

Scientific classification
- Kingdom: Animalia
- Phylum: Chordata
- Class: Reptilia
- Order: Squamata
- Family: Scincidae
- Subfamily: Eugongylinae
- Genus: Cryptoblepharus; Wiegmann, 1834

Type species
- Ablepharus poecilipleurus Wiegmann, 1834

Species
- see text

= Cryptoblepharus =

Genus of lizards

Cryptoblepharus is a genus of skinks, lizards in the family Scincidae. The genus contains at least 53 species.

== Taxonomy ==
The genus Cryptoblepharus was established in 1834 by the zoologist Arend Friedrich August Wiegmann. The type species of the genus was not nominated by the author, but this was assigned to Ablepharus poecilipleurus Wiegmann, 1834 in a revision by Leonhard Stejneger published in 1899. An emendation to the name as Cryptoblepharis by J. T. Cocteau in 1836 is considered a synonym, as is Petia, the name published by John Edward Gray in 1839 without a type or description.

They occupy a fairly basal position among the Eugongylus group.

Cryptoblepharus species, some of which are often seen in urban environments, are commonly named as fence skinks, or by characteristics such as their lack of eyelids, snake-eyed skinks, or as shining-skinks for their glossy skins.

== Description ==
Member species of the genus Cryptoblepharus are small-bodied, lack eyelids, are pentadactyl, and have shiny scales. They are able to move rapidly and with great agility, snatching insects from the air and climbing vertical surfaces with ease. They are often observed basking in the sun and disappearing into a hole or crevice in response to a perceived threat. Females may share a site to deposit their eggs, the species returning annually to lay a small clutch.

There are a large number of species, with a distribution range across many continents; they are the most widespread genus of the scincid family. Species are found at the east coast of Africa and on Madagascar in a western Indian Ocean range that is isolated from the species found in a region that includes Australia, Indonesia, New Guinea and the Pacific area. Outlying from the Pacific region are species found at three areas on the west coast of South America. The species are often associated with vertical, often rocky microhabitats and other niches, foraging and residing on surfaces that lack available water. Cliffs and rocks are typical abodes, sandstone near shorelines in a common habitat for some species, as well as trees in forest environments, and they are known to occur at ground level to forage or commute to another location or in environments that lack this habitat. The species may be locally common to abundant, in numbers up to twenty or thirty at a cliff, rock pile or other favoured site.

All species are oviparous, each female laying several eggs, and sexes are strongly dimorphic, the female distinguished by larger overall size with proportionally shorter head and legs. Detailed aspects of the reproduction activity are poorly known, especially the secretive manner in which the female places the eggs. Several sites of Cryptoblepharus species have been located, the include within the inner chambers of ant plants in New Guinea, ant inhabited species of Rubiaceae which also contained the broods of several females. The ability to occupy vertical environs is favoured by the fences and brick walls of urbanisation, where clusters of eggs have also occasionally been discovered within the cavities, and glimpses of them basking in the sun are frequently made before they rapidly flee any disturbance. When seen on a tree, the arboreal species will continually circle to the opposite side to evade a possible threat.

Feeding is probably opportunistic, any arthropod that is small enough to consume, which is known to include spiders, ants and termites. Trails of winged ants have been observed as feeding opportunities, and some species are recorded seizing dead insects being carried by a line of worker ants. Juvenile fish are also known to be eaten. These skinks are a source of food to a number of predators, but which species are able to capture them is also poorly surveyed. An individual has been observed as prey to a centipede, albeit when both were trapped (C. cygnatus), and they are a known prey item of other lizards, such as the pygopod Lialis burtonis.

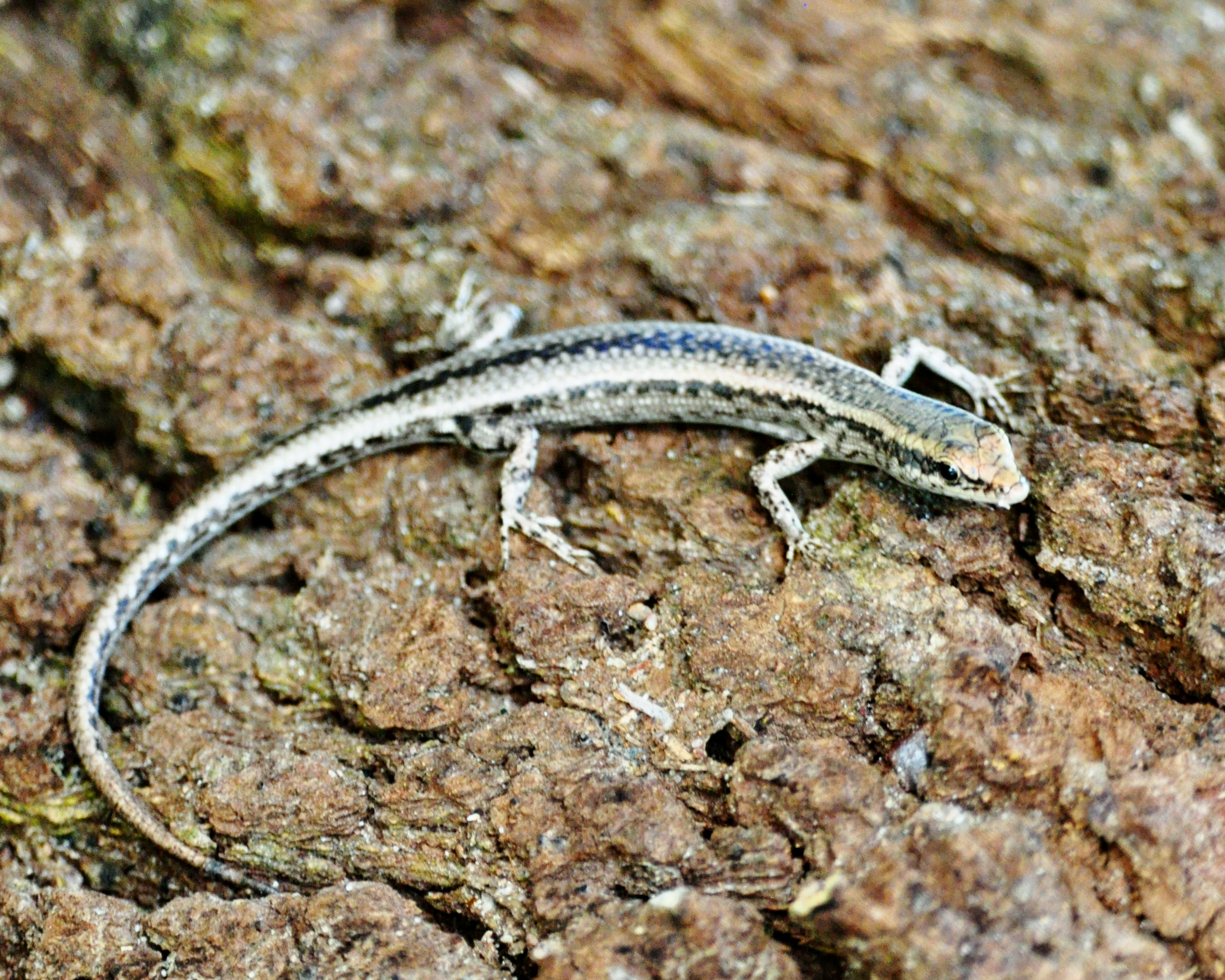
Cryptoblepharus metallicus, metallic snake-eyed skink

A revision of Australasian species, published in two papers in 2007, compared morphological and molecular phylogenies and concluded that there was unrecognised diversity within the genus. The author, Paul Horner of the Northern Territory Museum, published revised systematics that sampled widely distributed populations in the Australian region, with small samples of taxa from other regions, to identify twenty five taxa in Australia, another thirteen in the southwest of the Indian oceanic area, and a further twenty four in the Indo-Pacific, listing 62 taxonomic descriptions of the genus in total.

== Species ==
A list of recognised species includes the following 53 species.

- Cryptoblepharus adamsi Horner, 2007 – Adams's snake-eyed skink
- Cryptoblepharus africanus (Sternfeld, 1918) – East African snake-eyed skink, African coral rag skink
- Cryptoblepharus ahli Mertens, 1928 – Ahl's snake-eyed skink
- Cryptoblepharus aldabrae (Sternfeld, 1918)
- Cryptoblepharus ater (Boettger, 1913) – black snake-eyed skink
- Cryptoblepharus australis (Sternfeld, 1918) – inland snake-eyed skink
- Cryptoblepharus balinensis Barbour, 1911
- Cryptoblepharus bitaeniatus (Boettger, 1913)
- Cryptoblepharus boutonii (Desjardins, 1831) – Bouton's skink, Bouton's snake-eyed skink, snake-eyed skink
- Cryptoblepharus buchananii (Gray, 1838) – Buchanan's snake-eyed skink
- Cryptoblepharus burdeni Dunn, 1927
- Cryptoblepharus caudatus (Sternfeld, 1918)
- Cryptoblepharus cognatus (Boettger, 1913) – Nossy Be snake-eyed skink
- Cryptoblepharus cursor Barbour, 1911
- Cryptoblepharus cygnatus Horner, 2007 – Swanson's snake-eyed skink
- Cryptoblepharus daedalos Horner, 2007 – dappled snake-eyed skink
- Cryptoblepharus egeriae (Boulenger, 1888) – Christmas Island blue-tailed shining-skink, blue-tailed skink, Christmas Island blue-tailed skink
- Cryptoblepharus eximius Girard, 1857
- Cryptoblepharus exochus Horner, 2007 – noble snake-eyed skink
- Cryptoblepharus fuhni Covacevich & Ingram, 1978 – black-boulder shinning-skink
- Cryptoblepharus furvus Horner, 2007
- Cryptoblepharus gloriosus (Stejneger, 1893) – Glorioso snake-eyed skink
- Cryptoblepharus gurrmul Horner, 2007 – Arafura snake-eyed skink
- Cryptoblepharus juno Horner, 2007 – Juno's snake-eyed skink
- Cryptoblepharus keiensis (Roux, 1910)
- Cryptoblepharus leschenault (Cocteau, 1832)
- Cryptoblepharus litoralis (Mertens, 1958) – coastal snake-eyed skink, supralittoral shinning-skink
- Cryptoblepharus megastictus Storr, 1976 – blotched shinning-skink
- Cryptoblepharus mertensi Horner, 2007 – Mertens's snake-eyed skink
- Cryptoblepharus metallicus (Boulenger, 1887) – metallic snake-eyed skink
- Cryptoblepharus nigropunctatus (Hallowell, 1861)
- Cryptoblepharus novaeguineae Mertens, 1928 – New Guinea snake-eyed skink
- Cryptoblepharus novocaledonicus (Mertens, 1928) – New Caledonian shore skink
- Cryptoblepharus novohebridicus (Mertens, 1928)
- Cryptoblepharus ochrus Horner, 2007 – pale snake-eyed skink
- Cryptoblepharus pannosus Horner, 2007 – ragged snake-eyed skink
- Cryptoblepharus plagiocephalus (Cocteau, 1836) – Péron's snake-eyed skink, callose-palmed shinning-skink
- Cryptoblepharus poecilopleurus (Wiegmann, 1836) – mottled snake-eyed skink, Oceania snake-eyed skink
- Cryptoblepharus pulcher (Sternfeld, 1918) – elegant snake-eyed skink
- Cryptoblepharus quinquetaeniatus (Günther, 1874) – five-lined snake-eyed skink
- Cryptoblepharus renschi Mertens, 1928
- Cryptoblepharus richardsi Horner, 2007
- Cryptoblepharus ruber Börner & Schüttler, 1981 – tawny snake-eyed skink
- Cryptoblepharus rutilus (W. Peters, 1879)
- Cryptoblepharus schlegelianus Mertens, 1928 – Schlegel's snake-eyed skink
- Cryptoblepharus tytthos Horner, 2007 – pygmy snake-eyed skink
- Cryptoblepharus ustulatus Horner, 2007 – russet snake-eyed skink
- Cryptoblepharus virgatus (Garman, 1901) – cream-striped shinning-skink, wall skink
- Cryptoblepharus voeltzkowi (Sternfeld, 1918) – Voeltzkow's snake-eyed skink
- Cryptoblepharus wulbu Horner, 2007 – spangled snake-eyed skink
- Cryptoblepharus xenikos Horner, 2007
- Cryptoblepharus yulensis Horner, 2007
- Cryptoblepharus zoticus Horner, 2007 – agile snake-eyed skink

Nota bene: A binomial authority in parentheses indicates that the species was originally described in a genus other than Cryptoblepharus.
