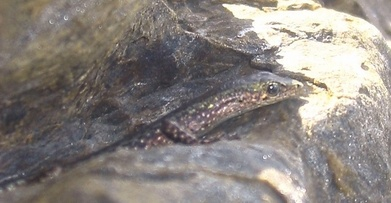

Conservation status
- Least Concern (IUCN 3.1)

Scientific classification
- Kingdom: Animalia
- Phylum: Chordata
- Class: Reptilia
- Order: Squamata
- Family: Scincidae
- Genus: Cryptoblepharus
- Species: C. litoralis

Binomial name
- Cryptoblepharus litoralis (Mertens, 1958)

= Cryptoblepharus litoralis =

Species of lizard

Cryptoblepharus litoralis, the coastal snake-eyed skink or supralittoral shinning-skink, is a small skink found in North Queensland, Australia and New Guinea.

They are generally found darting around the rocky outcrops on beaches and headlands, not far from the water, hunting for small insects. Its genus name means "hidden eyelid", and its species name "intertidal". It is commonly known as the coastal tree skink.

Cryptoblepharus litoralis is around 55 mm snout to vent, and dark-brown to black in colour with white to beige spots. The lower surface of the feet are shiny black. Cryptoblepharus plagiocephalus is a very similar species, but has brownish lower surfaces on the feet.
