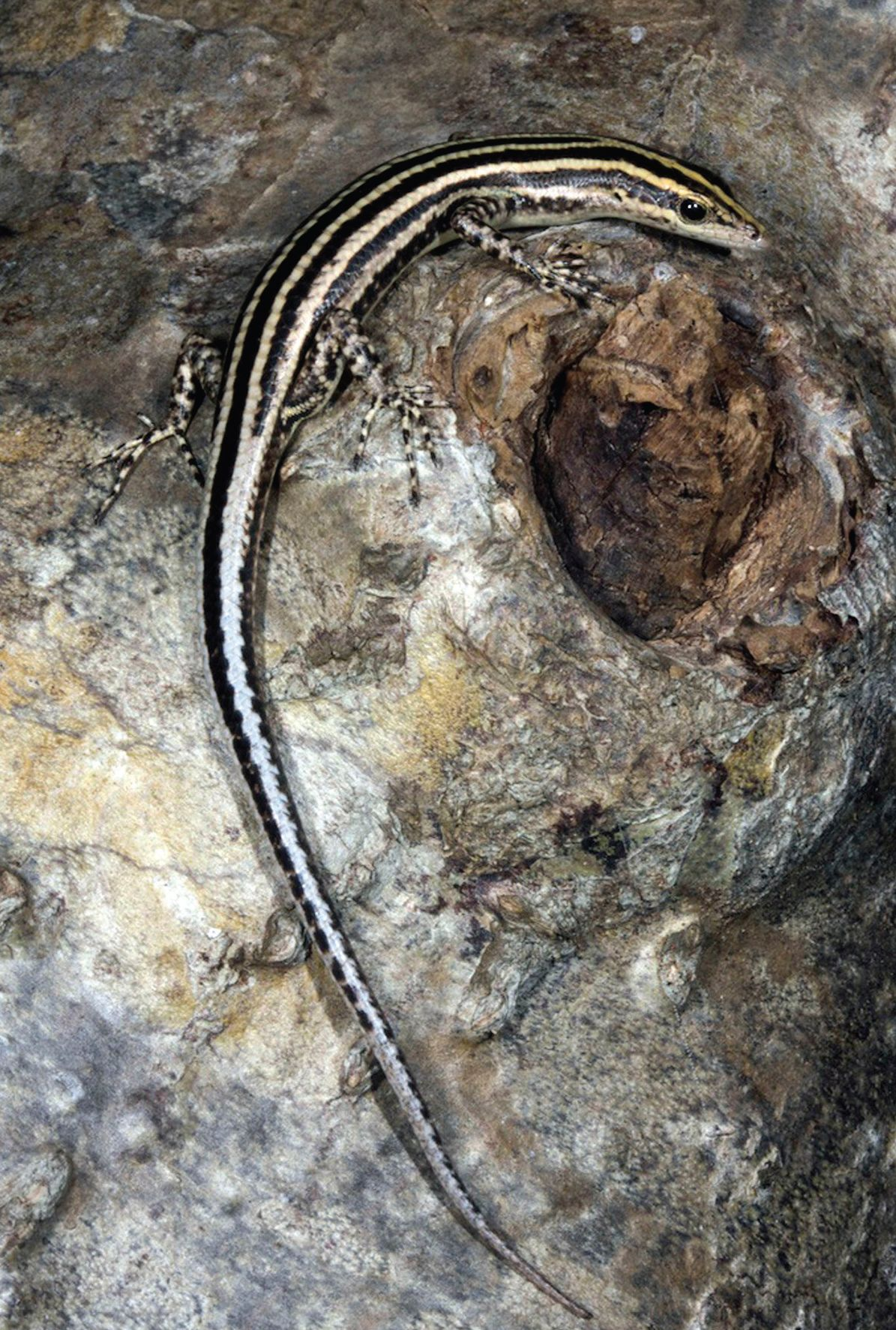

Conservation status
- Least Concern (IUCN 3.1)

Scientific classification
- Kingdom: Animalia
- Phylum: Chordata
- Class: Reptilia
- Order: Squamata
- Family: Scincidae
- Genus: Cryptoblepharus
- Species: C. leschenault

Binomial name
- Cryptoblepharus leschenault (Cocteau, 1832)
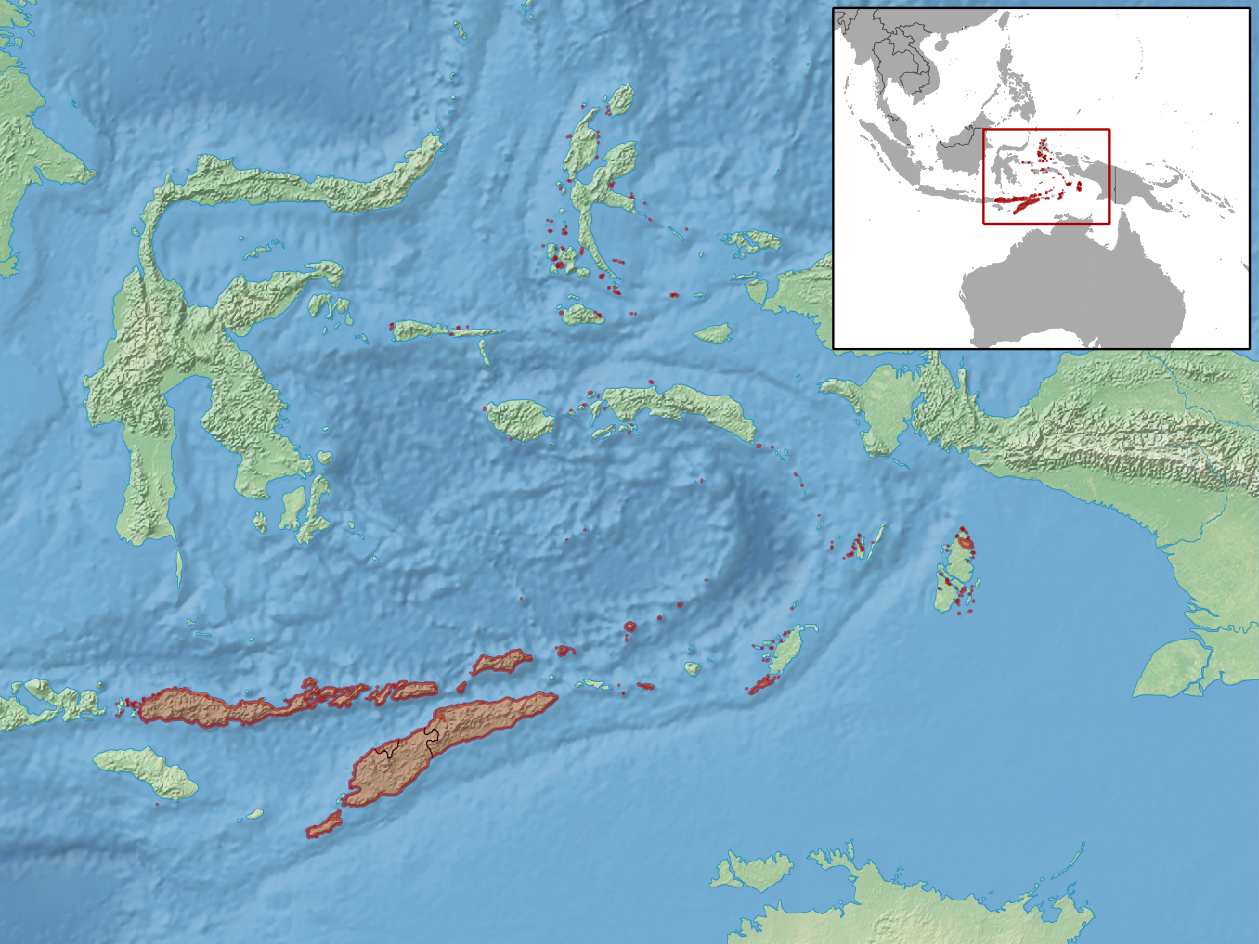

Synonyms
- Ablepharis leschenault Cocteau, 1832; Cryptoblepharus leschenaultii — Gray, 1838; Ablepharus boutonii var. furcata Weber, 1890; Cryptoblepharus boutonii furcata — Dunn, 1927; Ablepharus boutonii leschenault — Mertens, 1930; Cryptoblepharis leschenault — Greer, 1974

= Cryptoblepharus leschenault =

Species of lizard

Cryptoblepharus leschenault is a species of lizard in the subfamily Eugongylinae of the family Scincidae. The species is endemic to Indonesia.

== Etymology ==
The specific name, leschenault, is in honor of French biologist Jean-Baptiste Leschenault de La Tour, who collected the holotype.

== Habitat ==
The preferred natural habitat of C. leschenault is forest.

== Reproduction ==
C. leschenault is oviparous.
