= Anolis ignigularis =

Scientific classification
- Kingdom: Animalia
- Phylum: Chordata
- Class: Reptilia
- Order: Squamata
- Suborder: Iguania
- Family: Dactyloidae
- Genus: Anolis
- Species: A. ignigularis

Binomial name
- Anolis ignigularis Mertens, 1939

Species of lizard

Anolis ignigularis is a species of a lizard in the family Dactyloidae. The species is found in the Dominican Republic.
