= Cyrtodactylus halmahericus =

Scientific classification
- Kingdom: Animalia
- Phylum: Chordata
- Class: Reptilia
- Order: Squamata
- Suborder: Gekkota
- Family: Gekkonidae
- Genus: Cyrtodactylus
- Species: C. halmahericus

Binomial name
- Cyrtodactylus halmahericus (Mertens, 1929)

Synonyms
- Gymnodactylus fumosus halmahericus

Species of gecko endemic to Indonesia

Cyrtodactylus halmahericus is a species of gecko that is endemic to Halmahera in Indonesia.
