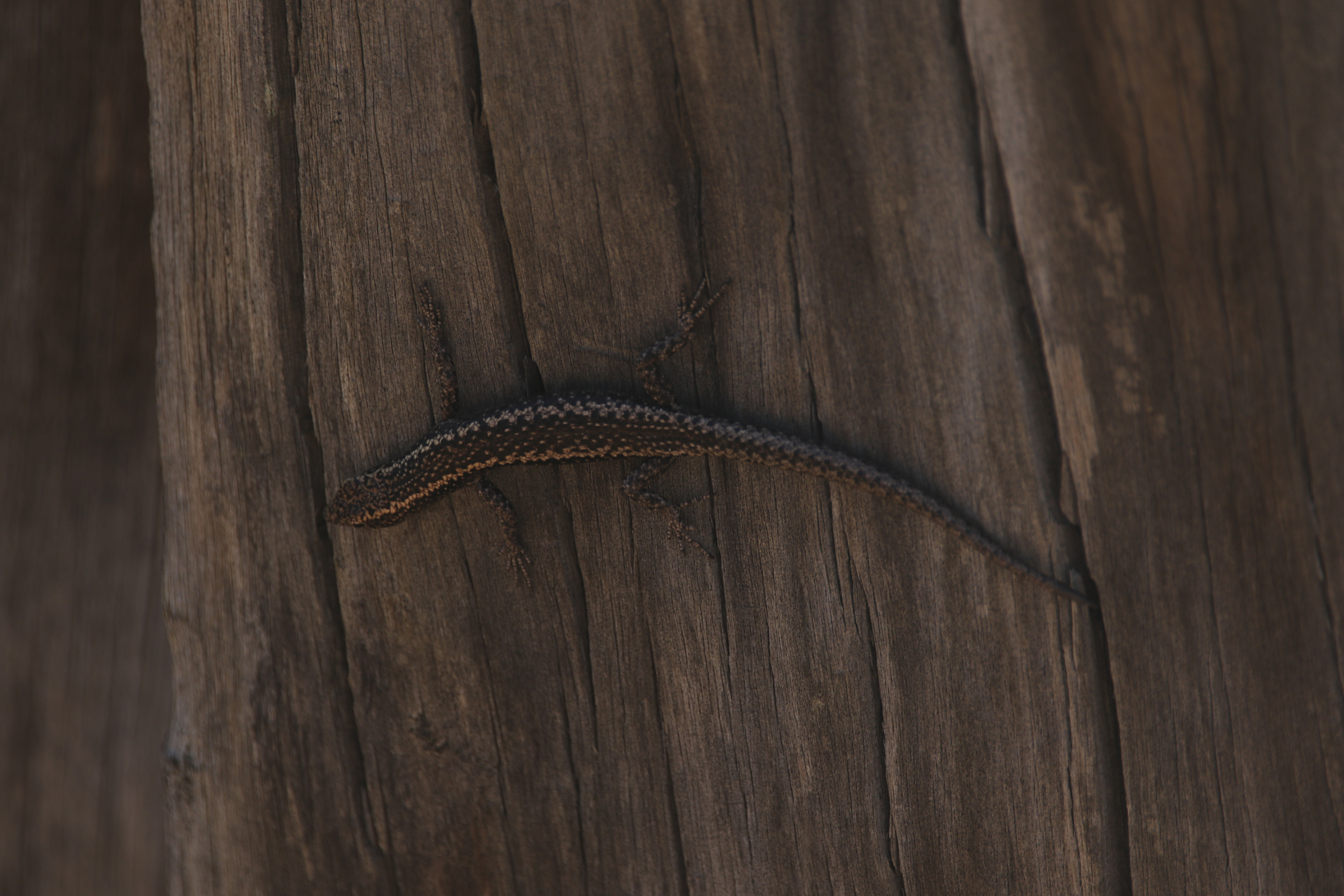

Conservation status
- Least Concern (IUCN 3.1)

Scientific classification
- Kingdom: Animalia
- Phylum: Chordata
- Class: Reptilia
- Order: Squamata
- Family: Scincidae
- Genus: Cryptoblepharus
- Species: C. australis

Binomial name
- Cryptoblepharus australis Sternfeld, 1918

= Cryptoblepharus australis =

Species of lizard

Cryptoblepharus australis, commonly called the inland snake-eyed skink, is a species of skink in the genus Cryptoblepharus.

Pronunciation: KRIP-toe-BLEFF-ah-russ / oss-TRAH-liss

== Etymology ==
Cryptoblepharus: 'hidden eyelid', referring to the fused eyelids.

Australis: 'southern', or more generally referring to Australia

== Introduction ==
A major and much-needed revision of the genus was undertaken in 2007 by Paul Horner of the Northern Territory Museum, previously splitting this species into a bunch of species each of which occupies quite a distinct range occurring over Australia.

Paul Horner (2008), says Cryptoblepharus are unique species to the Territory. A study recently has found the top end is a hot spot for snake eyed skinks with one new discovery that was very exciting for herpetologist Paul Horner (2008).

== Description of species ==
C. australis usually has quite distinct features: 6 supraciliary scales, 24 mid-body scale rows; smooth sub digital lamellae; immaculate, acute plantar scales. They are greyish in colour and have a longitudinal aligned body pattern. Cryptoblepharus snaked-eyed skink species live on vertical surfaces of rocks, trees and buildings which are challenging habitats that demand quite different adaptions and body characteristics. These physical characteristics include a dorsally depressed body and long splayed limbs, digits which create a low centre of gravity and an intimate contact with the surface. These little skinks are as swift and sure footed vertically as they are horizontally on a plane.

Similar species include; Metallic snake-eyed skink (Cryptoblepharus metallicus) Adams' snake-eyed skink (Cryptoblepharus adamsi) Fuhn's snake-eyed skink (Cryptoblepharus fuhni) Cryptoblepharus litoralis Cryptoblepharus virgatus, wall skink

== Distribution ==
It is distributed across arid inland Australia, extending north to vicinity of Barkley Highway in the Northern Territory and Queensland, east to the central plains of Queensland, east to the central plains of Queensland and New South Wales, and south Eyre Peninsula in South Australia. In Western Australia, it is known from Murchison and Great Victoria Desert bioregions For more of an idea, it is found in the interior of the state including these places; 'Binerah Downs' station, Yetman area, Armidale and Wahgunyah State Forest

== Habitat ==
The Cryptoplepharus australis lives in; Semi-arid zone, woodland, open woodland, shrub land, grasslands, spinifex type environment

== Habits ==
It is an arboreal (tree dwelling), rock inhabiting and diurnal (active during the day), in a natural environment they are found under bark on standing trees, and crevices in the dead timber and rocks. Snake eyed skinks even occupy the walls of buildings well within the central business districts such as Perth and Cairns. The Crytoplepharus genus species 'Snake eyed Skink' as mentioned above thrives on vertical surfaces of rocks, trees and buildings which are challenging habitats that demand quite different adaptations.

== Threats ==
General threats to all reptiles include:

habitat loss from land clearing habitat degradation by introduced species such as cattle and rabbits habitat modification caused by global climate change death on roads feral predators such as dogs, cats, pigs and foxes the introduced cane toad emerging diseases

== Reproduction ==
It produces two eggs to a clutch.

== Diet ==
Its diet consists of insects.

== Further Reference ==
Paul Horner (2007) Systematics of the snake-eyed skinks, Cryptoblepharus Wiegmann (Reptilia: Squamata: Scincidae)– an Australian-based review
