= Micrurus mertensi =

Conservation status
- Least Concern (IUCN 3.1)

Scientific classification
- Kingdom: Animalia
- Phylum: Chordata
- Class: Reptilia
- Order: Squamata
- Suborder: Serpentes
- Family: Elapidae
- Genus: Micrurus
- Species: M. mertensi

Binomial name
- Micrurus mertensi Schmidt, 1936
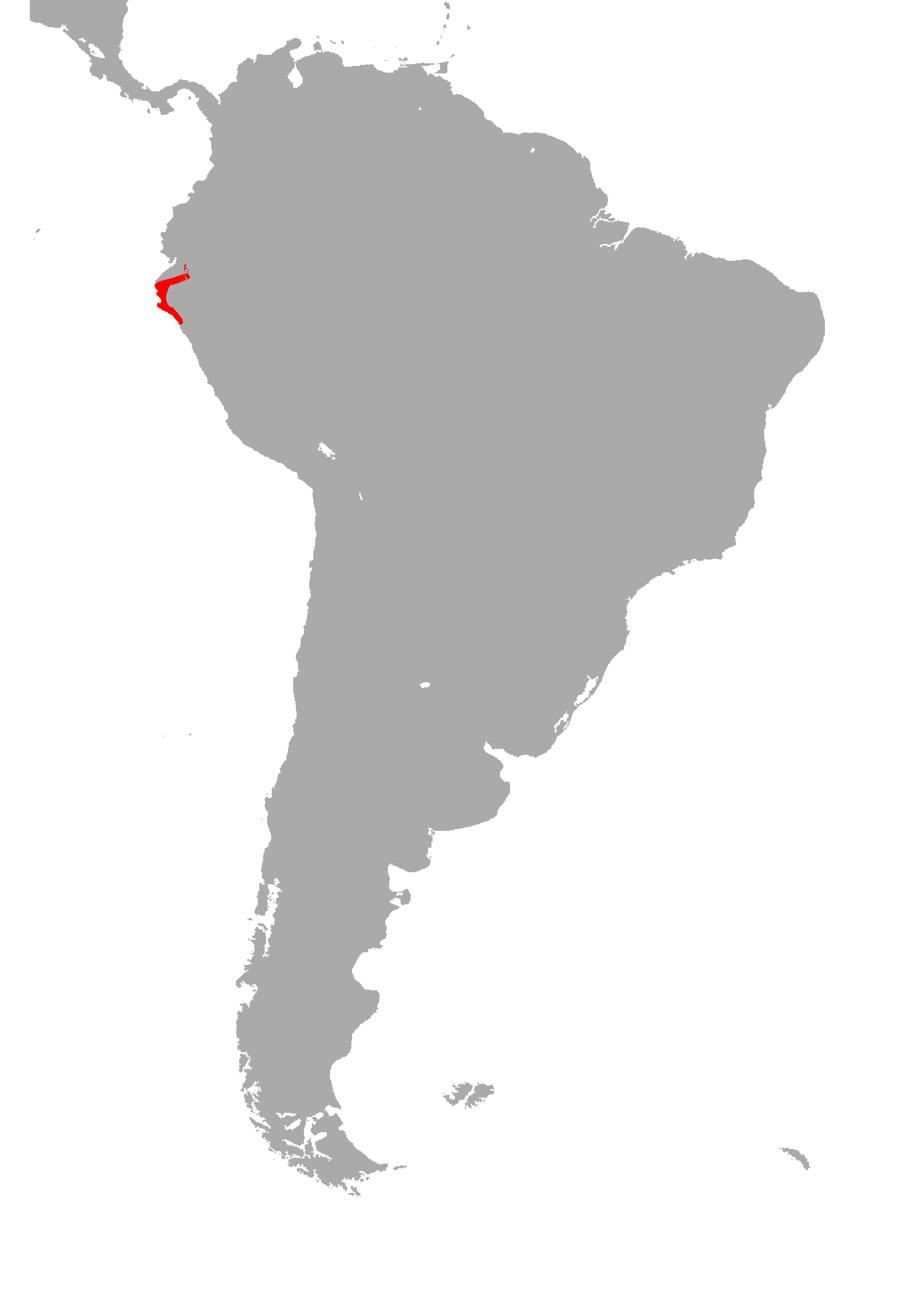

Species of snake

Micrurus mertensi, also known commonly as Mertens's coral snake, the Peruvian desert coral snake, and la coral peruana del desierto in South American Spanish, is a species of venomous snake in the family Elapidae. The species is native to northwestern South America.

== Etymology ==
The specific name, mertensi, is in honor of German herpetologist Robert Mertens.

== Description ==
Micrurus mertensi is medium to large for the genus Micrurus. Adults usually have a total length (tail included) of 50–80 cm (20–31 in), but the maximum recorded total length is 111.5 cm (43.9 in).

Like most New World coral snakes, the color pattern of M. mertensi consists of a combination of red, black, and white (or yellow) rings. The red rings are widest, and some of the included dorsal scales may have small black tips. The black rings are slightly narrower and are not arranged in triads. The white rings, which separate the red from the black, are narrowest and may not extend across the venter.

== Geographic distribution ==
Micrurus mertensi is found in Ecuador and Peru.

== Habitat ==
Micrurus mertensi is found in a variety of habitats, including forest, shrubland, and desert, at elevations from near sea level to 2,400 m (7,900 ft), usually near a river or stream.

== Behavior ==
Micrurus mertensi is terrestrial.

== Diet ==
Micrurus mertensi preys on snakes (ophiophagy), including blind snakes such as Epictia subcrotilla, and the venomous pit viper Bothrops pictus.

== Reproduction ==
Micrurus mertensi, is oviparous.

== Venom ==
The average venom yield obtained by scientists "milking" Micrurus mertensi was 2 mg (dry weight). The lethal dose for an adult human is unknown.
