= Cryptoblepharus ahli =

Conservation status
- Data Deficient (IUCN 3.1)

Scientific classification
- Kingdom: Animalia
- Phylum: Chordata
- Class: Reptilia
- Order: Squamata
- Family: Scincidae
- Genus: Cryptoblepharus
- Species: C. ahli

Binomial name
- Cryptoblepharus ahli Mertens, 1928

Synonyms
- Cryptoblepharus boutonii ahli Mertens, 1928; Ablepharus boutonii ahli — Mertens, 1931; Cryptoblepharus ahli — Greer, 1974

Species of lizard

Cryptoblepharus ahli, also known commonly as Ahl's snake-eyed skink, is a species of lizard in the family Scincidae. The species is endemic to the Island of Mozambique in Mozambique.

== Reproduction ==
C. ahli is oviparous.
