= Cryptoblepharus renschi =

Conservation status
- Least Concern (IUCN 3.1)

Scientific classification
- Kingdom: Animalia
- Phylum: Chordata
- Class: Reptilia
- Order: Squamata
- Family: Scincidae
- Genus: Cryptoblepharus
- Species: C. renschi

Binomial name
- Cryptoblepharus renschi Mertens, 1928
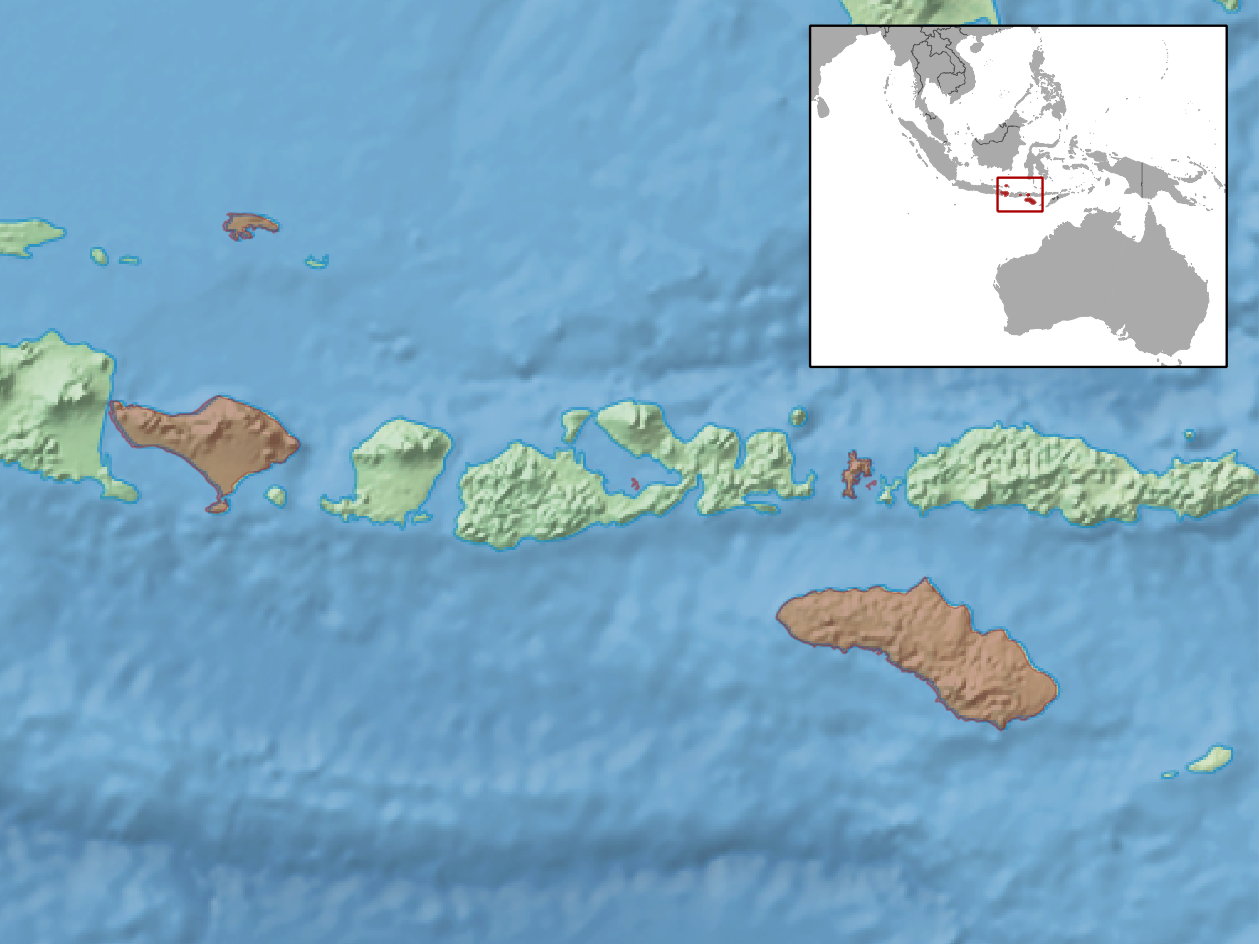

Species of lizard

Cryptoblepharus renschi is a species of lizard in the family Scincidae. It is endemic to Indonesia.
