= Cryptoblepharus quinquetaeniatus =

Conservation status
- Vulnerable (IUCN 3.1)

Scientific classification
- Kingdom: Animalia
- Phylum: Chordata
- Class: Reptilia
- Order: Squamata
- Family: Scincidae
- Genus: Cryptoblepharus
- Species: C. quinquetaeniatus

Binomial name
- Cryptoblepharus quinquetaeniatus (Günther, 1874)

Species of lizard

Cryptoblepharus quinquetaeniatus, the five-lined snake-eyed skink, is a species of lizard in the family Scincidae. It is endemic to Anjouan in the Comoro Islands. It was most recently assessed for the IUCN Red List in 2020. It is listed as vulnerable under Criterion D2.
