= Cryptoblepharus mertensi =

Conservation status
- Least Concern (IUCN 3.1)

Scientific classification
- Kingdom: Animalia
- Phylum: Chordata
- Class: Reptilia
- Order: Squamata
- Family: Scincidae
- Genus: Cryptoblepharus
- Species: C. mertensi

Binomial name
- Cryptoblepharus mertensi Horner, 2007

Species of lizard

Cryptoblepharus mertensi, also known commonly as Merten's snake-eyed skink, is a species of lizard in the subfamily Eugongylinae of the family Scincidae. The species is endemic to the Northern Territory in Australia.

== Etymology ==
The specific name, mertensi, is in honor of German herpetologist Robert Mertens.

== Habitat ==
The preferred natural habitat of Cryptoblepharus mertensi is forest.

== Description ==
Small for its genus and short-legged for its genus, Cryptoblepharus mertensi may attain a snout-to-vent length (SVL) of 4 cm (1.6 in).

== Behavior ==
Cryptoblepharus mertensi is arboreal.

== Reproduction ==
Cryptoblepharus mertensi is oviparous.
