= Cryptoblepharus ater =

Conservation status
- Vulnerable (IUCN 3.1)

Scientific classification
- Kingdom: Animalia
- Phylum: Chordata
- Class: Reptilia
- Order: Squamata
- Family: Scincidae
- Genus: Cryptoblepharus
- Species: C. ater

Binomial name
- Cryptoblepharus ater (Boettger, 1913)
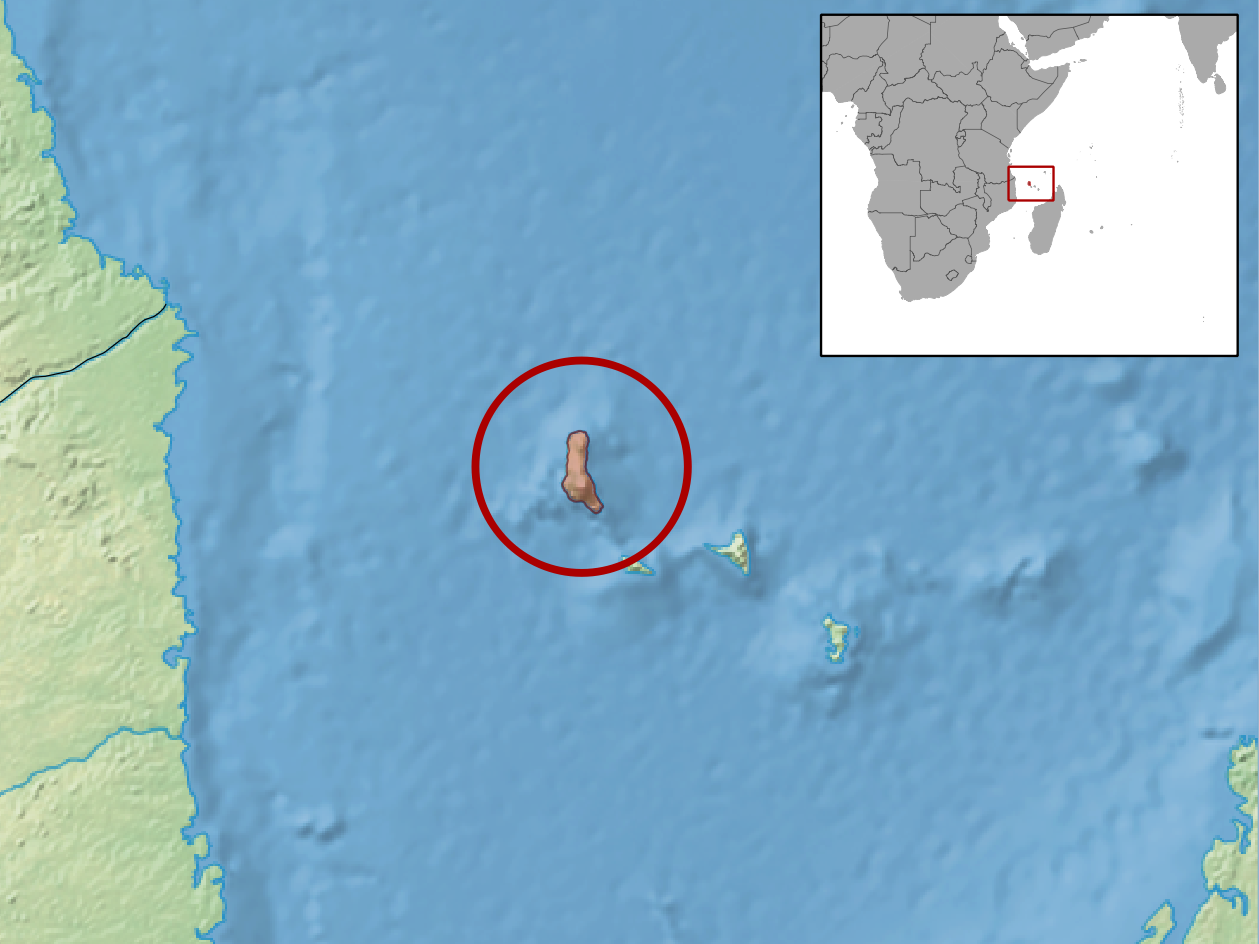

Species of lizard

Cryptoblepharus ater, the black snake-eyed skink, is a species of lizard in the family Scincidae. It is endemic to the island of Grande Comore, Comoros.
