= Cryptoblepharus xenikos =

Conservation status
- Data Deficient (IUCN 3.1)

Scientific classification
- Kingdom: Animalia
- Phylum: Chordata
- Class: Reptilia
- Order: Squamata
- Family: Scincidae
- Genus: Cryptoblepharus
- Species: C. xenikos

Binomial name
- Cryptoblepharus xenikos Horner, 2007

Species of lizard

Cryptoblepharus xenikos is a species of lizard in the family Scincidae. The species is endemic to Papua New Guinea.

== Habitat ==
The preferred natural habitat of C. xenikos is savanna.

== Reproduction ==
C. xenikos is oviparous.
