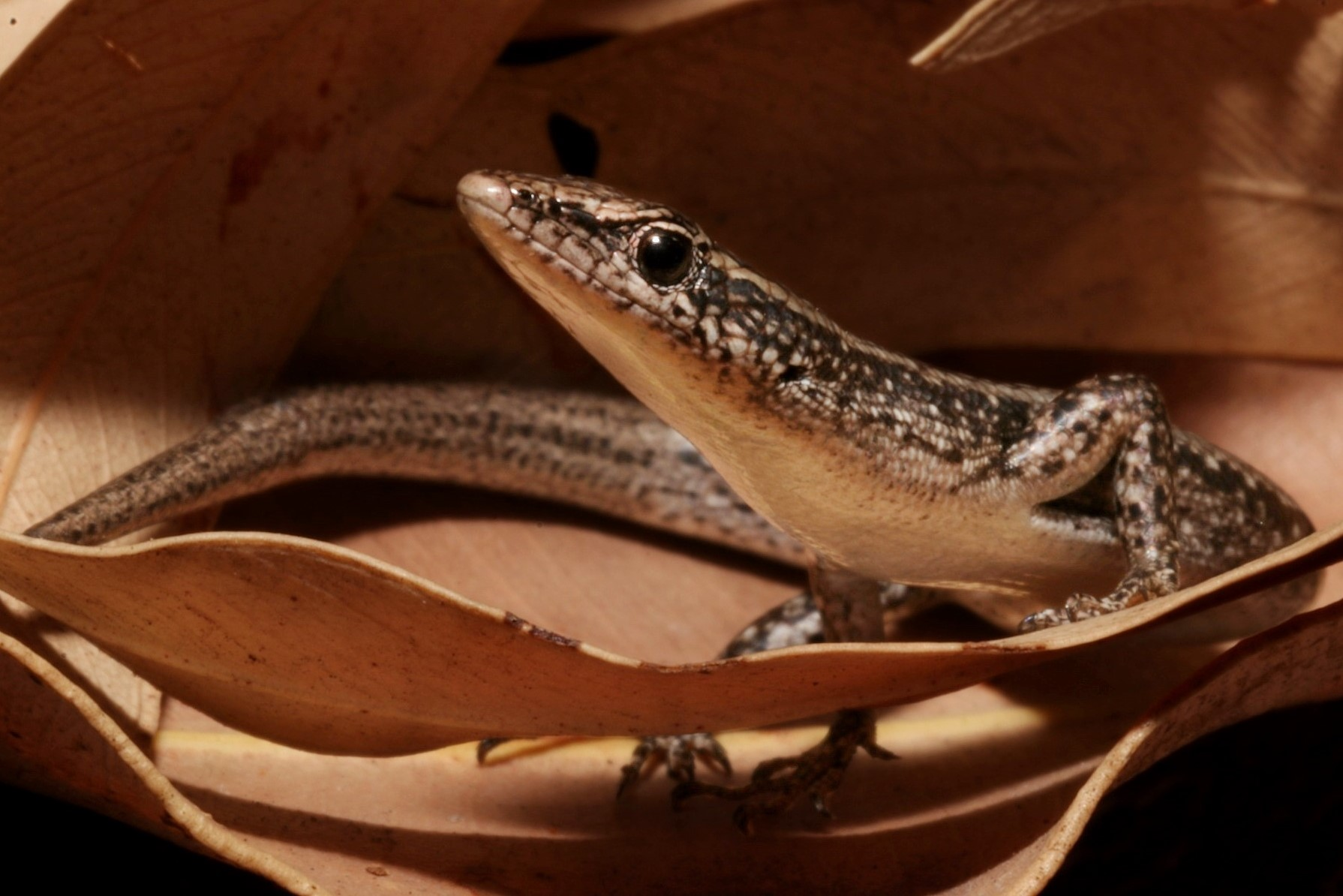

Conservation status
- Least Concern (IUCN 3.1)

Scientific classification
- Kingdom: Animalia
- Phylum: Chordata
- Class: Reptilia
- Order: Squamata
- Family: Scincidae
- Genus: Cryptoblepharus
- Species: C. buchananii

Binomial name
- Cryptoblepharus buchananii (Gray, 1838)

Synonyms
- Tiliqua buchananii Gray, 1838; Cryptoblepharus buchananii — Horner, 2007

= Cryptoblepharus buchananii =

Species of lizard

Cryptoblepharus buchananii, also known as Buchanan's snake-eyed skink, is a species of lizard in the family Scincidae. The species is endemic to Western Australia.

== Description ==
Large for its genus, C. buchananii may attain a snout-to-vent length of 5 cm (2.0 in).

== Habitat ==
The preferred natural habitats of C. buchananii are desert, shrubland, and forest.

== Reproduction ==
C. buchananii is oviparous.
