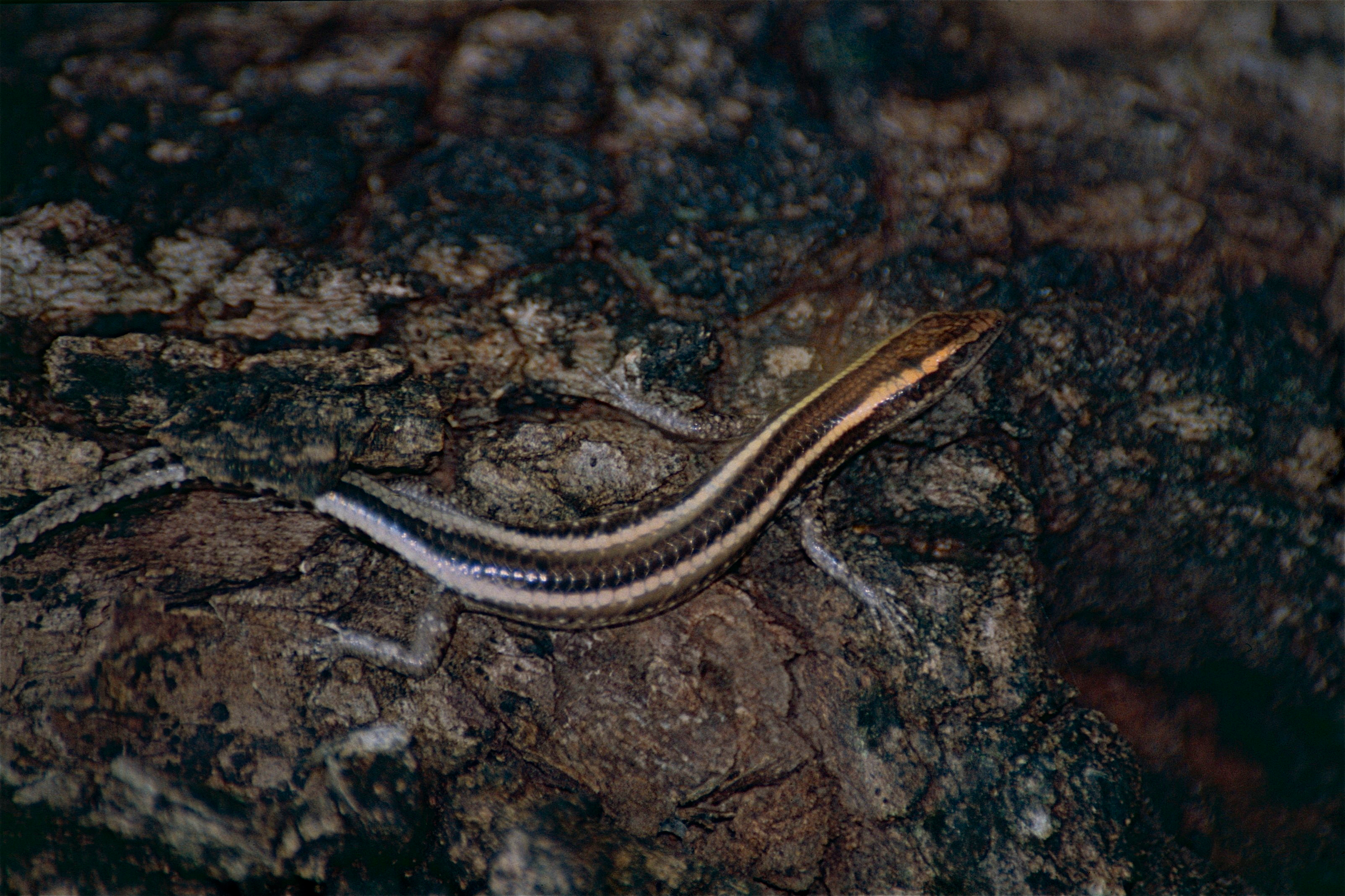

Conservation status
- Least Concern (IUCN 3.1)

Scientific classification
- Kingdom: Animalia
- Phylum: Chordata
- Class: Reptilia
- Order: Squamata
- Family: Scincidae
- Genus: Cryptoblepharus
- Species: C. pulcher

Binomial name
- Cryptoblepharus pulcher (Sternfeld, 1918)

= Cryptoblepharus pulcher =

Species of lizard

Cryptoblepharus pulcher, the elegant snake-eyed skink, is a species of lizard in the family Scincidae. It is endemic to southern and eastern Australia.
