= Cryptoblepharus cursor =

Scientific classification
- Kingdom: Animalia
- Phylum: Chordata
- Class: Reptilia
- Order: Squamata
- Family: Scincidae
- Genus: Cryptoblepharus
- Species: C. cursor

Binomial name
- Cryptoblepharus cursor Barbour, 1911

Species of lizard

Cryptoblepharus cursor is a species of lizard in the family Scincidae. It is endemic to Indonesia.
