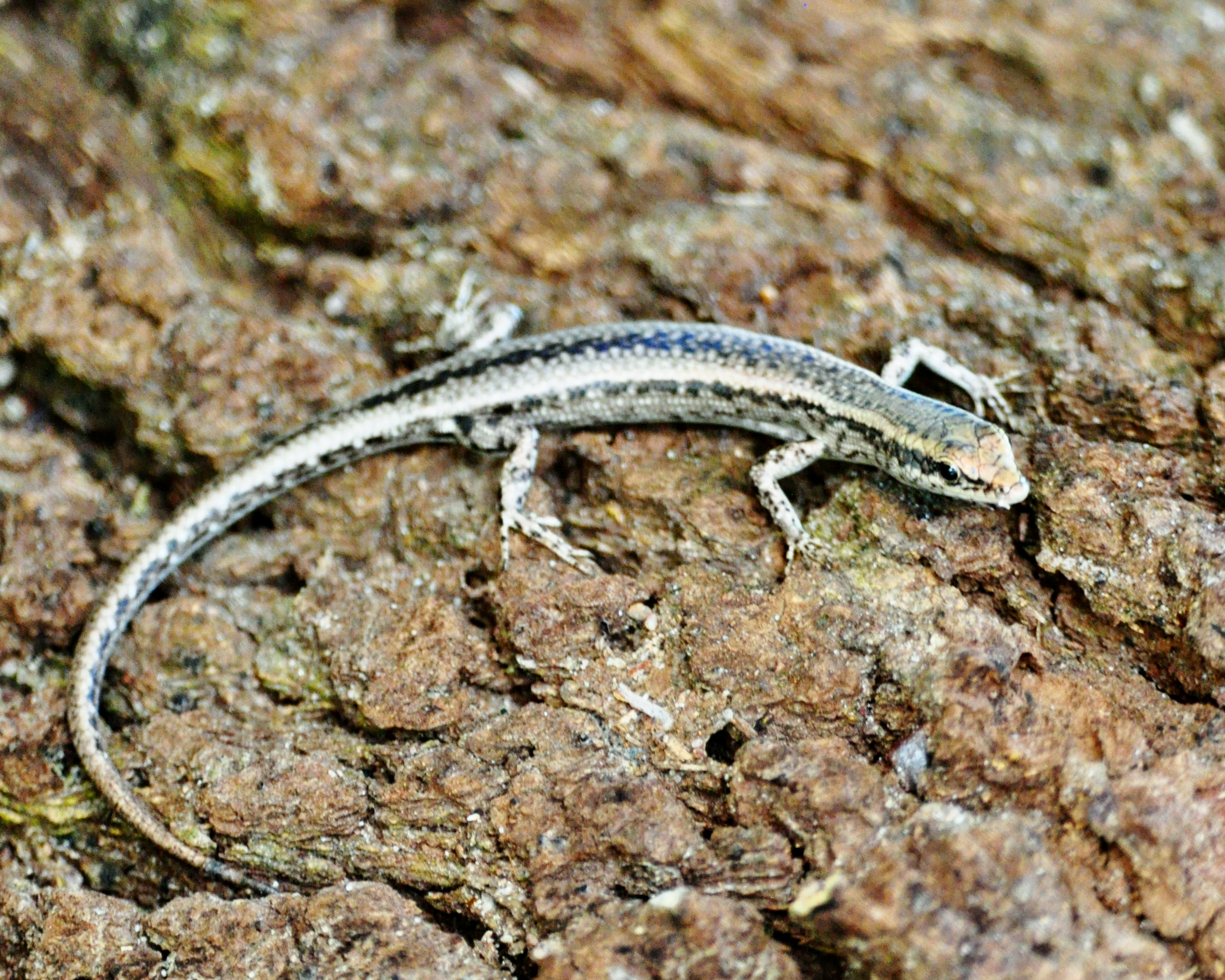

Conservation status
- Least Concern (IUCN 3.1)

Scientific classification
- Kingdom: Animalia
- Phylum: Chordata
- Class: Reptilia
- Order: Squamata
- Family: Scincidae
- Genus: Cryptoblepharus
- Species: C. metallicus

Binomial name
- Cryptoblepharus metallicus (Boulenger, 1887)

= Cryptoblepharus metallicus =

Species of lizard

Cryptoblepharus metallicus, the metallic snake-eyed skink, is a species of lizard in the family Scincidae. It is endemic to the Northern Territory, Queensland, and Western Australia.
