= Jean-Baptiste Leschenault de La Tour =

French botanist and ornithologist (1773-1826)

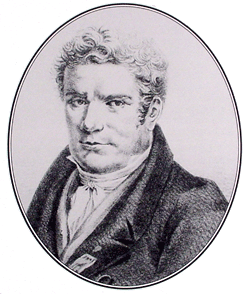
- Born: Jean-Baptiste Louis Claude Théodore Leschenault de La Tour; 13 November 1773; Le Villard, near Chalon-sur-Saône, France
- Died: 14 March 1826 (aged 52); Paris
- Known for: Collection of plants and birds of Java
- Awards: Légion d'Honneur.
- Scientific career
- Fields: Botany, ornithology
- Author abbrev. (botany): Lesch.

Jean-Baptiste Louis Claude Théodore Leschenault de La Tour (French pronunciation: [ʒɑ̃ batist lwi klod teɔdɔʁ lɛʃno də la tuʁ]; 13 November 1773 – 14 March 1826) was a French botanist and ornithologist.

Born at the family seat (since 1718), Le Villard, near Chalon-sur-Saône, Leschenault de la Tour arrived in Paris after the death of his father, a judge at Lyon.

Leschenault de La Tour was chief botanist on Nicolas Baudin's expedition to Australia between 1800 and 1803. He collected a great many new specimens in 1801 and 1802, though Baudin's journal suggests that he did not work particularly hard; apparently the poorly educated gardener's boy Antoine Guichenot collected more plant specimens than Leschenault did, and gave them more useful labels. In April 1803 he was so ill that he had to be put ashore at Timor. Forced to spend the next three years on Java he used the time to make the first thorough botanical investigation of the island, which had not previously been visited by naturalists except briefly by Carl Peter Thunberg. He arrived back in France in July 1807 with a large collection of plants and birds.

Leschenault's Javanese birds were described by Georges Cuvier.

Following the Napoleonic Wars, in May 1816 Leschenault travelled to India to collect plants and establish a botanical garden at Pondicherry. He was given permission by the British to travel through Madras, Bengal and Ceylon. He sent many of the plants and seeds he discovered to the French island of Réunion to be cultivated. These included two varieties of sugar cane and six varieties of cotton. He returned to France in 1822 and was awarded the Legion d'Honneur.

Less than a year after his return Leschenault travelled to South America, visiting Brazil, Surinam and French Guiana, and introducing tea bushes to Cayenne, the capital of the French colony. He was forced to return home after only eighteen months due to ill health.

Though Leschenault published little, his collections were subsequently used by other French botanists, including Aimé Bonpland, René Louiche Desfontaines, Antoine Laurent de Jussieu, Jacques Labillardière and Étienne Pierre Ventenat.

== Legacy ==
A number of birds were named after Leschenault, including greater sand plover (Anarhynchus leschenaultii), white-crowned forktail (Enicurus leschenaulti), sirkeer malkoha (Taccocua leschenaultii) and chestnut-headed bee-eater (Merops leschenaulti).

Three species of lizards were named after him: Cryptoblepharus leschenault, Hemidactylus leschenaultii, and Ophisops leschenaultii.

The plant genus Lechenaultia is also named after him, as well as several Western Australian geographical features including the Leschenault Estuary, the suburb of Leschenault, and Lake Leschenaultia.

== See also ==
- European and American voyages of scientific exploration
