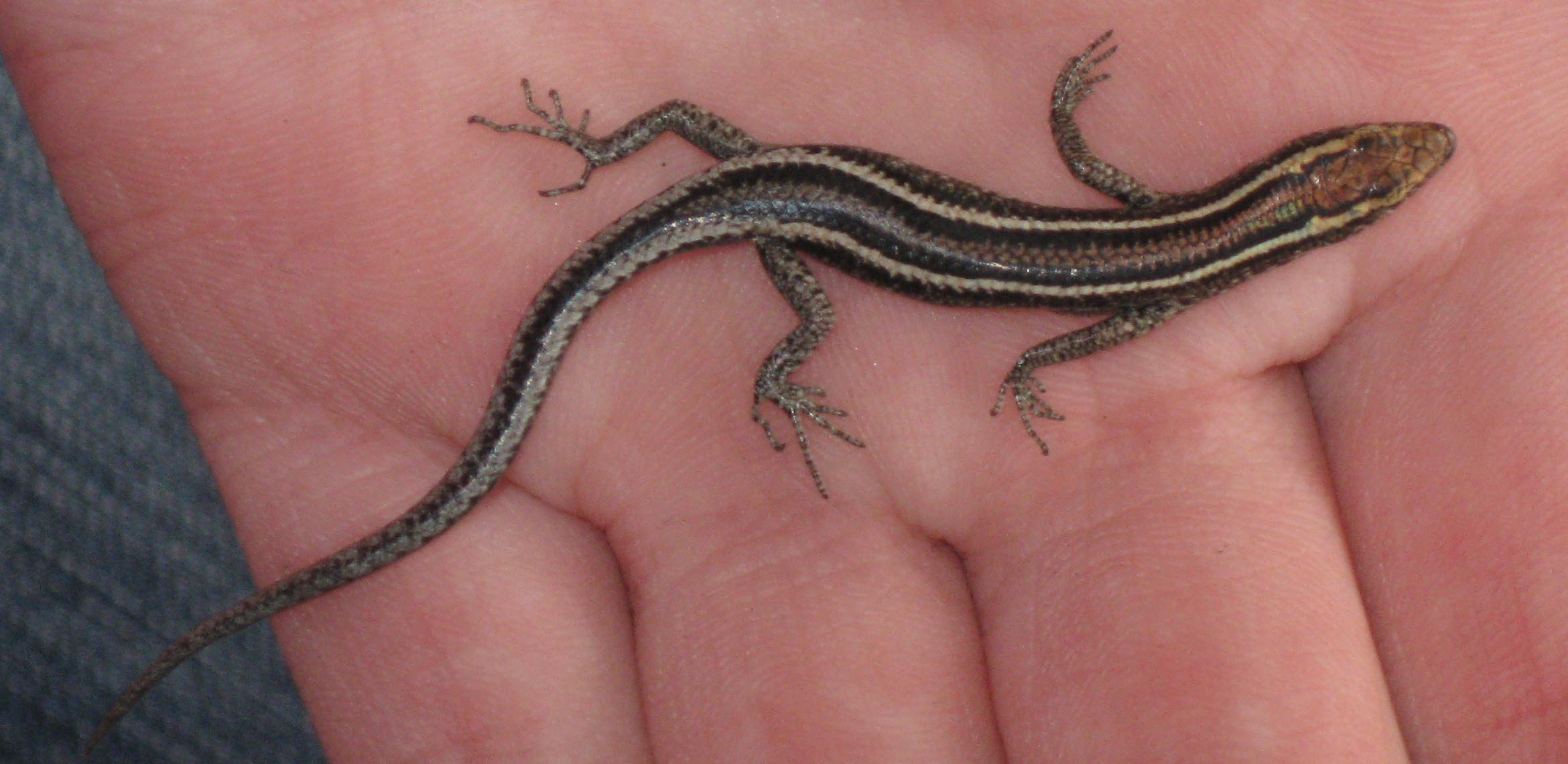

Conservation status
- Least Concern (IUCN 3.1)

Scientific classification
- Kingdom: Animalia
- Phylum: Chordata
- Class: Reptilia
- Order: Squamata
- Family: Scincidae
- Genus: Cryptoblepharus
- Species: C. virgatus

Binomial name
- Cryptoblepharus virgatus (Garman, 1901)

Synonyms
- Ablepharus virgatus Garman 1901; Ablepharus boutoni virgatus Garman, 1901

= Cryptoblepharus virgatus =

Species of lizard

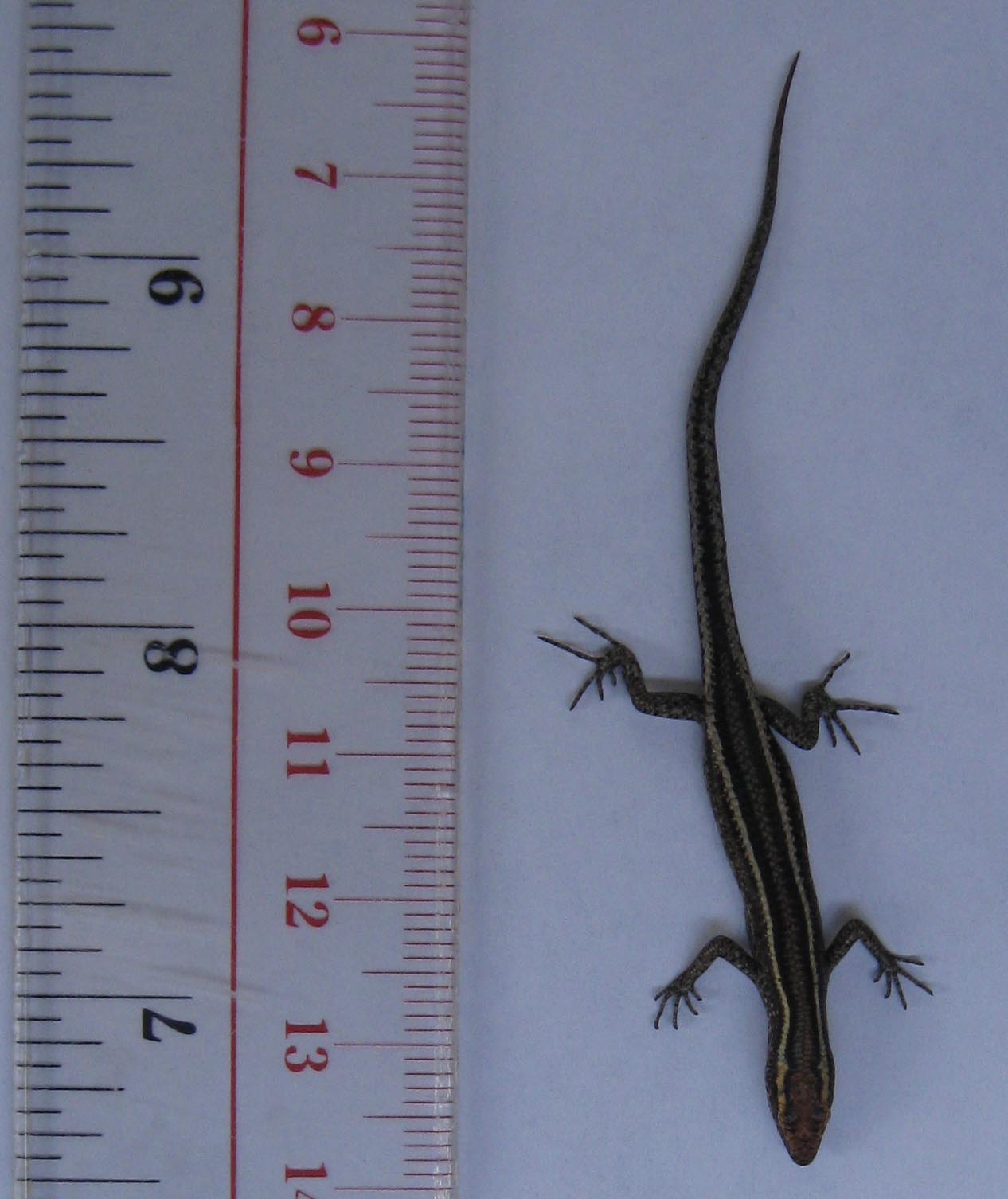
The fence skink may grow to a total length (tail included) of up to 10 cm (3.9 in).

Cryptoblepharus virgatus, also commonly known as the striped snake-eyed skink, cream-striped shinning-skink, wall skink, fence skink, and snake-eyed skink, is a species of lizard in the subfamily Eugongylinae of the family Scincidae (skinks). The species is native to northeastern Queensland, Australia. It is an active little lizard, and if threatened will often play dead to confuse the attacker.

== Description ==
Cryptoblepharus virgatus is a relatively small, flat-bodied skink of a silver-gray coloring. It has a distinct white stripe running along the body from the eye to the base of the tail. It typically grows to a snout-to-vent length (SVL) of around 4 cm (1.6 in) and a total length (tail included) of around 10 cm (3.9 in). It is sometimes called a snake-eyed skink because it lacks eyelids, instead having a translucent layer of scales covering its eyes similar to that of snakes. C. virgatus usually has five supraciliary scales, 22 rows of scales around the body at midbody, and eight plantar scales that are rounded and pale.

== Taxonomy ==
The species Cryptoblepharus virgatus was first formally identified and named Ablepharus virgatus by the herpetologist Samuel Garman in 1901 as part of the work "Some Reptiles and Batrachians from Australasia" as published in the Bulletin of the Museum of Comparative Zoölogy at Harvard College. The specific name virgatus is Latin for "striped".

== Geographic distribution ==
The geographic range of Cryptoblepharus virgatus is in northeastern Queensland.

== Habitat ==
The preferred habitats of Cryptoblepharus virgatus include urban areas, woodlands, and grasslands. It will often be seen on vertical surfaces such as trees, fences, and walls.
