= Cryptoblepharus ustulatus =

Conservation status
- Least Concern (IUCN 3.1)

Scientific classification
- Kingdom: Animalia
- Phylum: Chordata
- Class: Reptilia
- Order: Squamata
- Family: Scincidae
- Genus: Cryptoblepharus
- Species: C. ustulatus

Binomial name
- Cryptoblepharus ustulatus Horner, 2007

Species of lizard

Cryptoblepharus ustulatus, also known commonly as the russet snake-eyed skink, is a species of lizard in the family Scincidae. The species is endemic to the Australian state of Western Australia.
