= Cryptoblepharus richardsi =

Conservation status
- Data Deficient (IUCN 3.1)

Scientific classification
- Kingdom: Animalia
- Phylum: Chordata
- Class: Reptilia
- Order: Squamata
- Family: Scincidae
- Genus: Cryptoblepharus
- Species: C. richardsi

Binomial name
- Cryptoblepharus richardsi Horner, 2007

Species of lizard

Cryptoblepharus richardsi is a species of lizard in the family Scincidae. The species is endemic to Misima Island in the northwest of Louisiade Archipelago, Papua New Guinea.

== Etymology ==
The specific name, richardsi, is in honor of Australian herpetologist Stephen Richards, who collected the holotype.

== Habitat ==
The preferred natural habitat of C. richardsi is the marine intertidal zone, at altitudes from sea level to 5 m (16 ft).

== Description ==
Medium-sized for its genus and short-legged for its genus, C. richardsi has a snout-to-vent length (SVL) of 3.2–4.3 cm (1.3–1.7 in).

== Reproduction ==
C. richardsi is oviparous.
