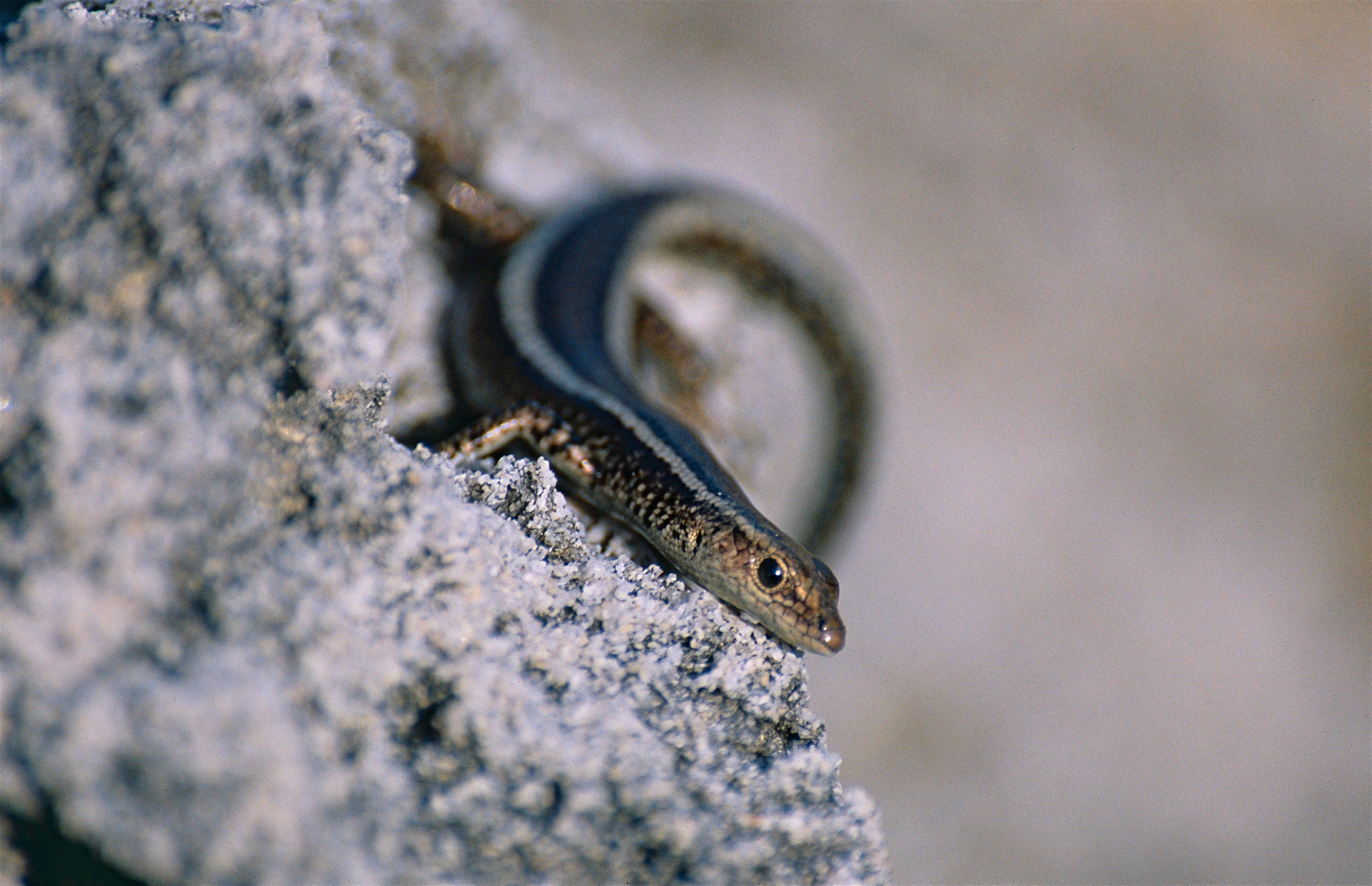

Conservation status
- Least Concern (IUCN 3.1)

Scientific classification
- Kingdom: Animalia
- Phylum: Chordata
- Class: Reptilia
- Order: Squamata
- Family: Scincidae
- Genus: Cryptoblepharus
- Species: C. africanus

Binomial name
- Cryptoblepharus africanus (Sternfeld, 1918)

= Cryptoblepharus africanus =

Species of lizard

Cryptoblepharus africanus, the East African snake-eyed skink or African coral rag skink, is a species of lizard in the family Scincidae. It is found in eastern Africa.
