= Cryptoblepharus gloriosus =

Conservation status
- Vulnerable (IUCN 3.1)

Scientific classification
- Kingdom: Animalia
- Phylum: Chordata
- Class: Reptilia
- Order: Squamata
- Family: Scincidae
- Genus: Cryptoblepharus
- Species: C. gloriosus

Binomial name
- Cryptoblepharus gloriosus (Stejneger, 1893)
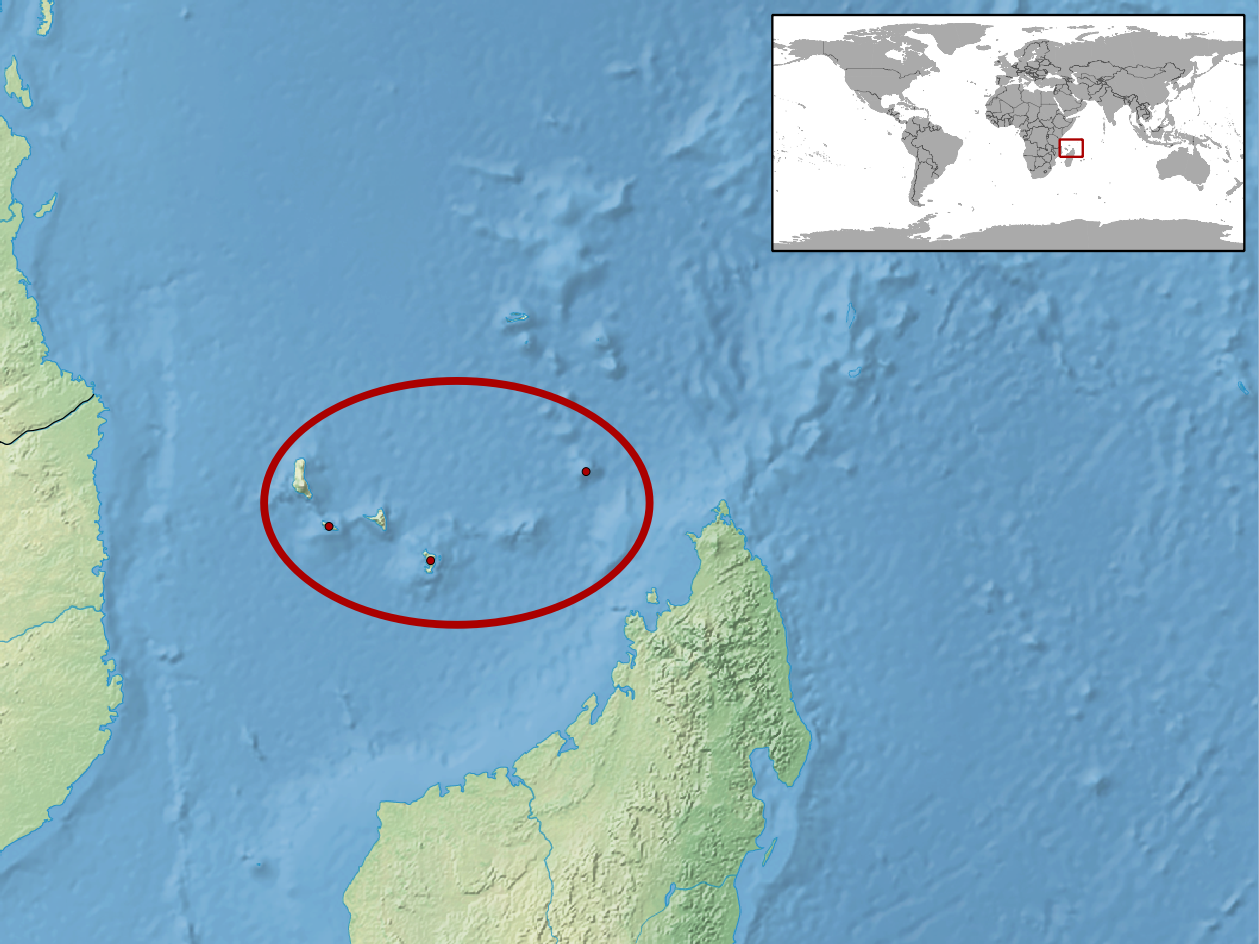

Species of lizard

Cryptoblepharus gloriosus, the Glorioso snake-eyed skink, is a species of lizard in the family Scincidae. It is endemic to the Comoros Islands, and can be found on Mayotte, Mohéli, and the Glorioso Islands.
