= Cryptoblepharus cognatus =

Conservation status
- Data Deficient (IUCN 3.1)

Scientific classification
- Kingdom: Animalia
- Phylum: Chordata
- Class: Reptilia
- Order: Squamata
- Family: Scincidae
- Genus: Cryptoblepharus
- Species: C. cognatus

Binomial name
- Cryptoblepharus cognatus (Boettger, 1881)

Species of lizard

Cryptoblepharus cognatus, also known commonly as the Nosy Be snake-eyed skink, is a species of lizard in the family Scincidae. It is endemic to Madagascar.
