= Cryptoblepharus bitaeniatus =

Conservation status
- Near Threatened (IUCN 3.1)

Scientific classification
- Kingdom: Animalia
- Phylum: Chordata
- Class: Reptilia
- Order: Squamata
- Family: Scincidae
- Genus: Cryptoblepharus
- Species: C. bitaeniatus

Binomial name
- Cryptoblepharus bitaeniatus (Boettger, 1913)

Species of lizard

Cryptoblepharus bitaeniatus is a species of lizard in the family Scincidae. It is endemic to Europa Island in Mozambique.
