= Cryptoblepharus eximius =

Scientific classification
- Kingdom: Animalia
- Phylum: Chordata
- Class: Reptilia
- Order: Squamata
- Family: Scincidae
- Genus: Cryptoblepharus
- Species: C. eximius

Binomial name
- Cryptoblepharus eximius Girard, 1858

Species of lizard

Cryptoblepharus eximius is a species of lizard in the family Scincidae. It is endemic to Fiji.
