= Cryptoblepharus wulbu =

Conservation status
- Least Concern (IUCN 3.1)

Scientific classification
- Kingdom: Animalia
- Phylum: Chordata
- Class: Reptilia
- Order: Squamata
- Family: Scincidae
- Genus: Cryptoblepharus
- Species: C. wulbu

Binomial name
- Cryptoblepharus wulbu Horner, 2007

Species of lizard

Cryptoblepharus wulbu, also known commonly as the spangled snake-eyed skink, is a species of lizard in the family Scincidae. The species is endemic to the Northern Territory in Australia.
