= Cryptoblepharus megastictus =

Conservation status
- Least Concern (IUCN 3.1)

Scientific classification
- Kingdom: Animalia
- Phylum: Chordata
- Class: Reptilia
- Order: Squamata
- Family: Scincidae
- Genus: Cryptoblepharus
- Species: C. megastictus

Binomial name
- Cryptoblepharus megastictus Storr, 1976

Species of lizard

Cryptoblepharus megastictus, the blotched shinning-skink, is a species of lizard in the family Scincidae. It is endemic to the Northern Territory and Western Australia.

== Distribution ==
This species is endemic to Australia. It is found in Western Australia and the Northern Territory.
