= Cryptoblepharus yulensis =

Conservation status
- Least Concern (IUCN 3.1)

Scientific classification
- Kingdom: Animalia
- Phylum: Chordata
- Class: Reptilia
- Order: Squamata
- Family: Scincidae
- Genus: Cryptoblepharus
- Species: C. yulensis

Binomial name
- Cryptoblepharus yulensis Horner, 2007

Species of lizard

Cryptoblepharus yulensis is a species of skink, a lizard in the family Scincidae. The species is endemic to Papua New Guinea.
