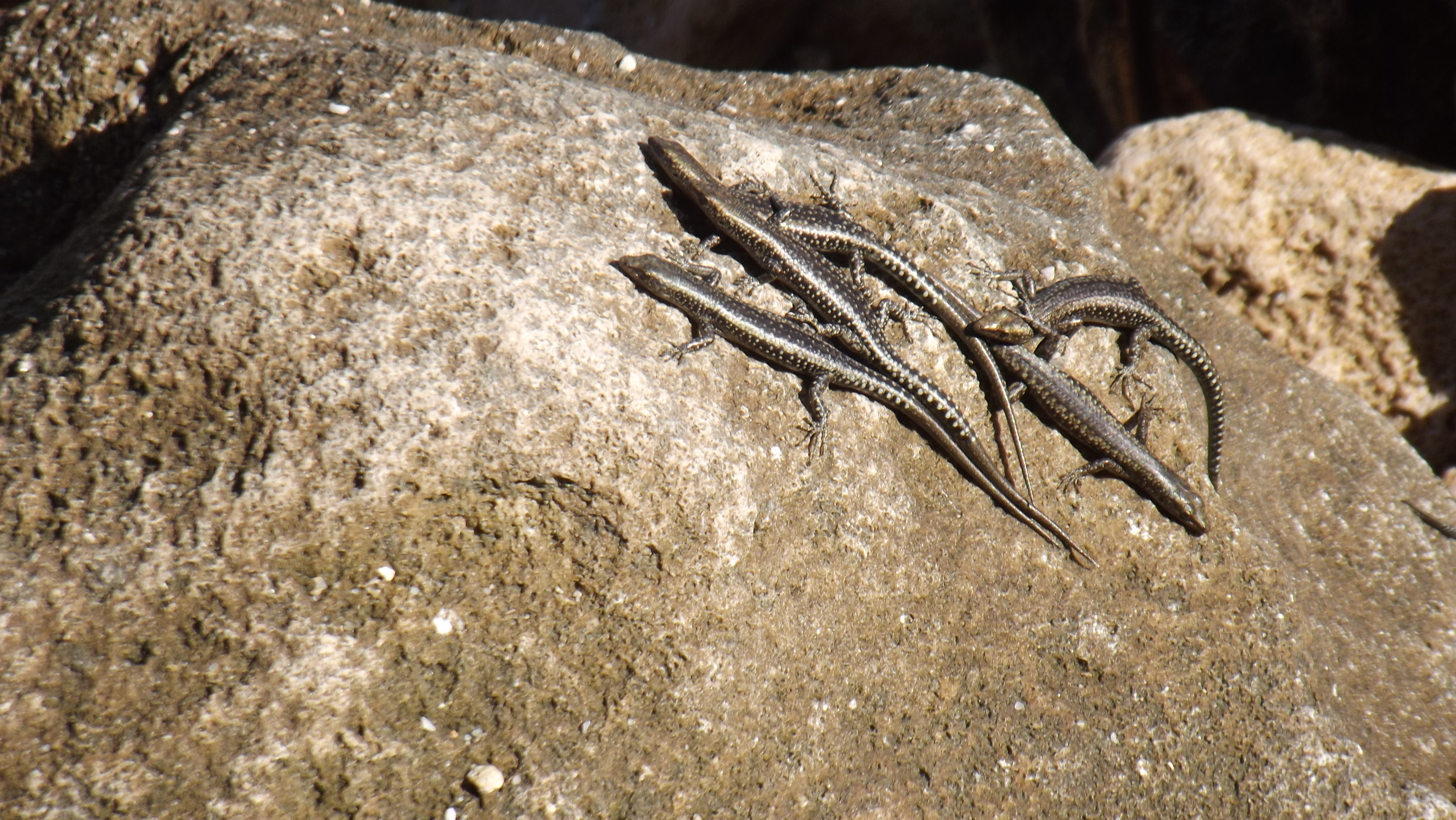

Conservation status
- Data Deficient (IUCN 3.1)

Scientific classification
- Kingdom: Animalia
- Phylum: Chordata
- Class: Reptilia
- Order: Squamata
- Family: Scincidae
- Genus: Cryptoblepharus
- Species: C. voeltzkowi

Binomial name
- Cryptoblepharus voeltzkowi (Sternfeld, 1918)

= Cryptoblepharus voeltzkowi =

Species of lizard

Cryptoblepharus voeltzkowi, Voeltzkow's snake-eyed skink, is a species of lizard in the family Scincidae. It is endemic to Madagascar.
