= Cryptoblepharus rutilus =

Conservation status
- Least Concern (IUCN 3.1)

Scientific classification
- Kingdom: Animalia
- Phylum: Chordata
- Class: Reptilia
- Order: Squamata
- Family: Scincidae
- Genus: Cryptoblepharus
- Species: C. rutilus

Binomial name
- Cryptoblepharus rutilus (Peters, 1879)
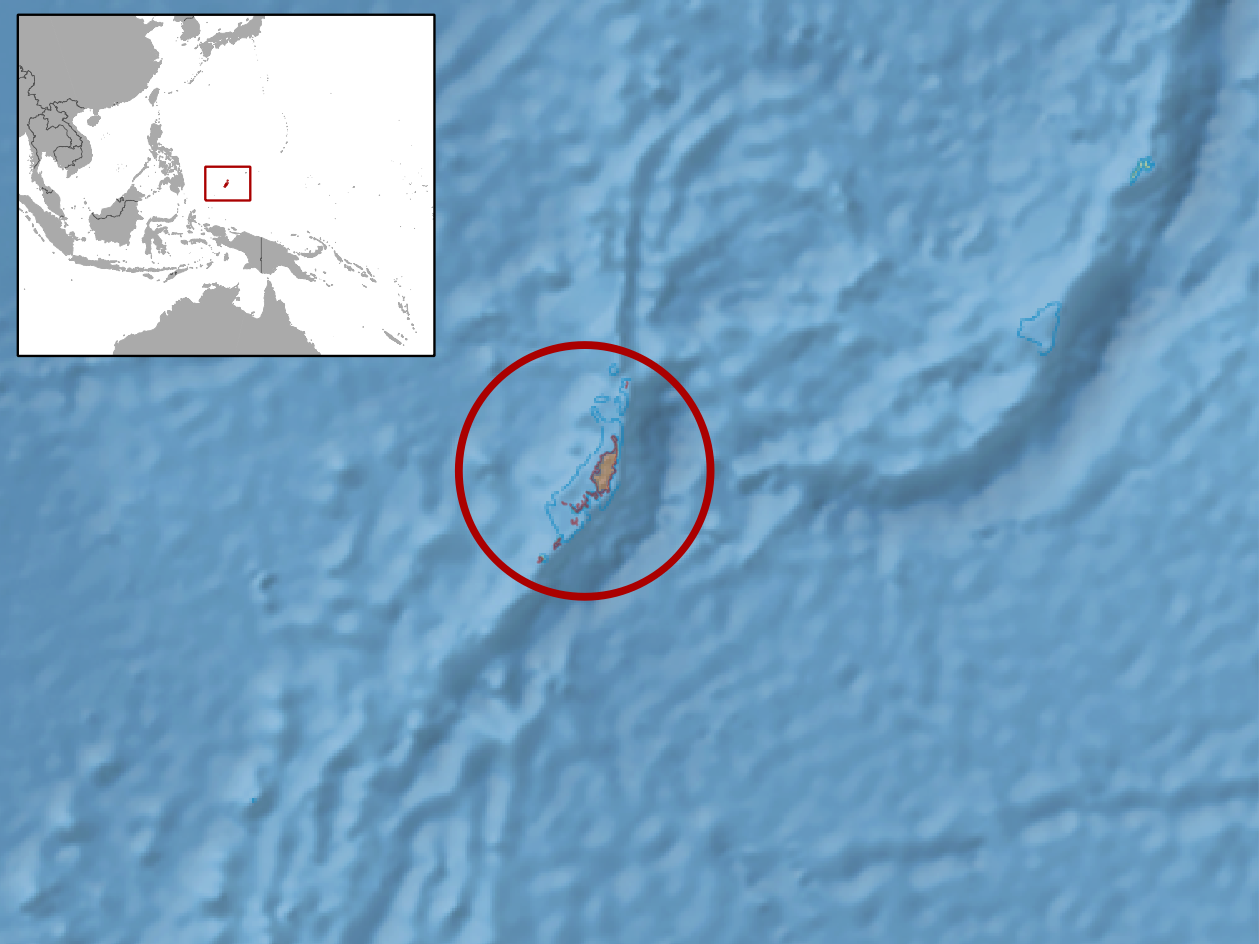

Species of lizard

Cryptoblepharus rutilus is a species of lizard in the family Scincidae. It is endemic to Palau.
