= Cryptoblepharus adamsi =

Conservation status
- Least Concern (IUCN 3.1)

Scientific classification
- Kingdom: Animalia
- Phylum: Chordata
- Class: Reptilia
- Order: Squamata
- Family: Scincidae
- Genus: Cryptoblepharus
- Species: C. adamsi

Binomial name
- Cryptoblepharus adamsi Horner, 2007

Species of lizard

Cryptoblepharus adamsi, also known commonly as Adams's snake-eyed skink, is a species of lizard in the family Scincidae. The species is endemic to Queensland in Australia.

== Etymology ==
The specific name, adamsi, is in honor of Australian biologist Mark Adams.

== Habitat ==
The preferred natural habitat of C. adamsi is savanna.

== Description ==
Small for its genus, C. adamsi has a snout-to-vent length (SVL) of less than 4 cm (1.6 in) as an adult.

== Behavior ==
C. adamsi is arboreal.

== Reproduction ==
C. adamsi is oviparous.
