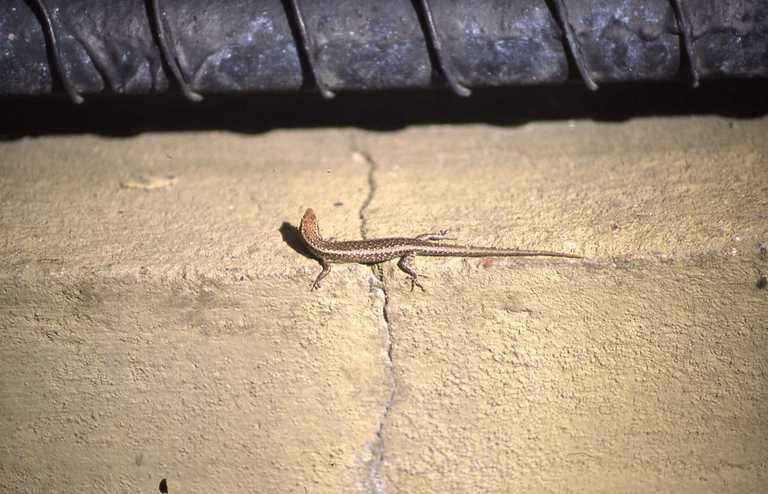

Conservation status
- Least Concern (IUCN 3.1)

Scientific classification
- Kingdom: Animalia
- Phylum: Chordata
- Class: Reptilia
- Order: Squamata
- Family: Scincidae
- Genus: Cryptoblepharus
- Species: C. plagiocephalus

Binomial name
- Cryptoblepharus plagiocephalus (Cocteau, 1836)

= Cryptoblepharus plagiocephalus =

Species of lizard

Cryptoblepharus plagiocephalus, Péron's snake-eyed skink or the callose-palmed shinning-skink, is a species of lizard in the family Scincidae. It is endemic to Australia.
