= Cryptoblepharus balinensis =

Scientific classification
- Kingdom: Animalia
- Phylum: Chordata
- Class: Reptilia
- Order: Squamata
- Family: Scincidae
- Genus: Cryptoblepharus
- Species: C. balinensis

Binomial name
- Cryptoblepharus balinensis Barbour, 1911

Species of lizard

Cryptoblepharus balinensis is a species of lizard in the family Scincidae. It is endemic to Indonesia.
