= Cryptoblepharus furvus =

Conservation status
- Least Concern (IUCN 3.1)

Scientific classification
- Kingdom: Animalia
- Phylum: Chordata
- Class: Reptilia
- Order: Squamata
- Family: Scincidae
- Genus: Cryptoblepharus
- Species: C. furvus

Binomial name
- Cryptoblepharus furvus Horner, 2007

Species of lizard

Cryptoblepharus furvus is a species of lizard in the family Scincidae. The species is endemic to Normanby Island in Papua New Guinea.
