= Emsleyan mimicry =

Mimicry of a less deadly species

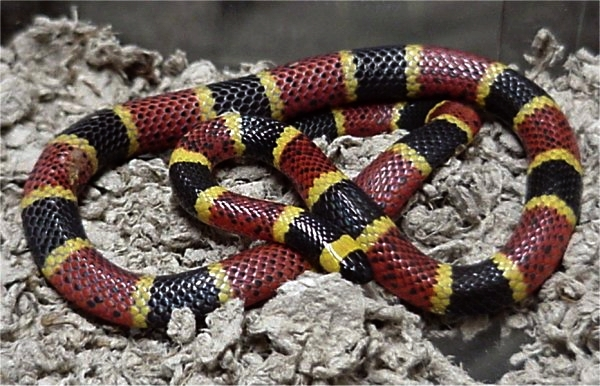
The deadly Texas coral snake, Micrurus tener (the Emsleyan/Mertensian mimic)

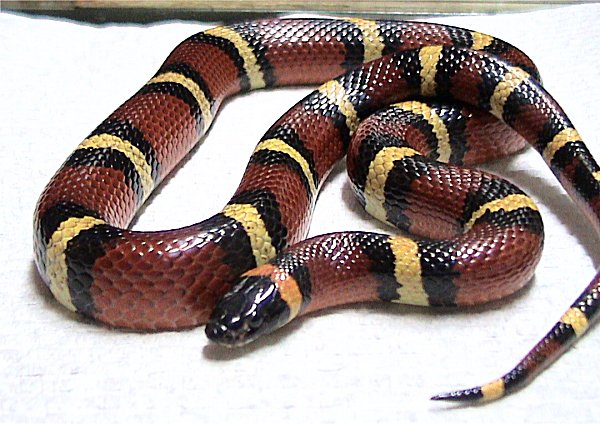
The harmless Mexican milk snake, Lampropeltis triangulum annulata (the Batesian mimic)

Emsleyan mimicry, also called Mertensian mimicry, describes an unusual type of mimicry where a deadly prey mimics a less dangerous species.

== History ==
Emsleyan mimicry was first proposed by M. G. Emsley as a possible explanation for how a predator species could learn to avoid an aposematic phenotype of potentially dangerous animals, such as the coral snake, when the predator is likely to die on its first encounter. The theory was developed by the German biologist Wolfgang Wickler in a chapter of Mimicry in Plants and Animals, who named it after the German herpetologist Robert Mertens. Sheppard points out that Hecht and Marien had put forward a similar hypothesis ten years earlier.

== Mimicry of a less deadly species ==
The scenario for Emsleyan mimicry is a little more difficult to understand than for other types of mimicry, since in other types of mimicry it is usually the most harmful species that is the model. But if a predator dies, it cannot learn to recognize a warning signal, e.g., bright colours in a certain pattern. In other words, there is no advantage in being aposematic for an organism that is likely to kill any predator it succeeds in poisoning; such an animal is better off being camouflaged, to avoid attacks altogether. If, however, there were some other species that were harmful but not deadly as well as aposematic, the predator could learn to recognize its particular warning colours and avoid such animals. A deadly species could then profit by mimicking the less dangerous aposematic organism if this reduces the number of attacks.

== Non-Emsleyan mechanisms ==
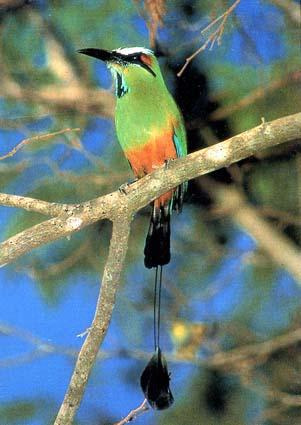
Turquoise-browed motmot innately avoids snakes with red and yellow rings.

Non-Emsleyan mechanisms that achieve the observed result, namely that predators avoid extremely deadly prey, are possible. Proposed alternatives include observational learning and innate avoidance. These provide alternative explanations to Emsleyan mimicry: if predators innately avoid a pattern then there is no need to suppose that the more deadly snake is mimicking the less deadly species in these cases.

=== Observational learning ===
One mechanism is observational learning, for example through watching a conspecific die. The observing predator then remembers that the prey is deadly and avoids it. Jouventin and colleagues conducted exploratory tests on baboons in 1977 that suggested this was possible.

=== Innate avoidance ===
Another possible mechanism is that a predator might not have to learn that a certain prey is harmful in the first place: it could have instinctive genetic programming to avoid certain signals. In this case, other organisms could benefit from this programming, and Batesian or Müllerian mimics of it could potentially evolve. Some species indeed do innately recognize certain aposematic patterns. Hand-reared turquoise-browed motmots (Eumomota superciliosa), avian predators, instinctively avoid snakes with red and yellow rings. Other colours with the same pattern, and even red and yellow stripes with the same width as rings, were tolerated. However, models with red and yellow rings were feared, with the birds flying away and giving alarm calls in some cases.

The models would not have to be other snakes. Large red and black millipedes are common and foul-tasting; various species of these millipedes form Müllerian mimicry rings, and some are the models for mimicry in lizards.

== Coral snake system ==
Some harmless milk snake (Lampropeltis triangulum) subspecies, the moderately toxic false coral snakes (genus Erythrolamprus), and the deadly coral snakes (genus Micrurus) all have a red background color with black and either white or yellow rings. Over 115 species or some 18% of snakes in the New World are within this mimicry system. In this system, Emsley stated that both the milk snakes and the deadly coral snakes are the mimics, whereas the false coral snakes are the models.

It has been suggested that this system could be an instance of pseudomimicry, the similar colour patterns having evolved independently in similar habitats.
