= Cryptoblepharus keiensis =

Conservation status
- Least Concern (IUCN 3.1)

Scientific classification
- Kingdom: Animalia
- Phylum: Chordata
- Class: Reptilia
- Order: Squamata
- Family: Scincidae
- Genus: Cryptoblepharus
- Species: C. keiensis

Binomial name
- Cryptoblepharus keiensis (Roux, 1910)

Species of lizard

Cryptoblepharus keiensis is a species of lizard in the family Scincidae. It is endemic to Indonesia.
