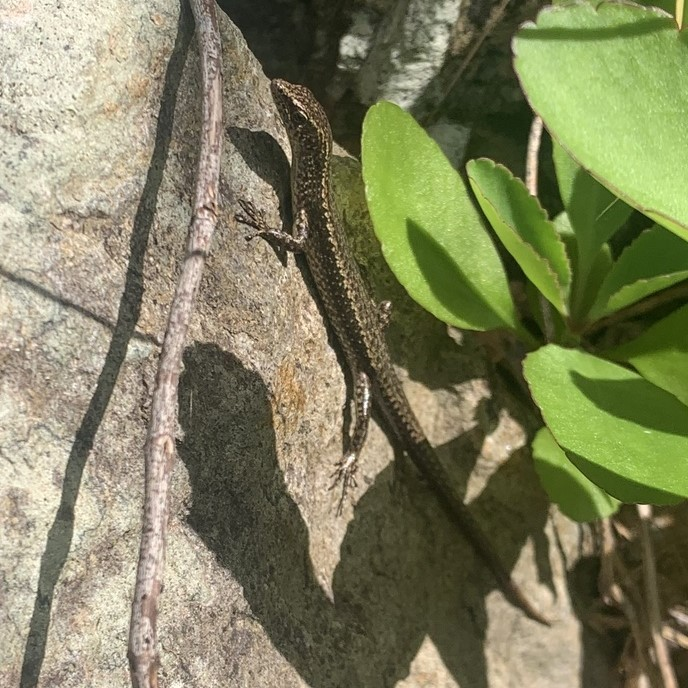

Conservation status
- Near Threatened (IUCN 3.1)

Scientific classification
- Kingdom: Animalia
- Phylum: Chordata
- Class: Reptilia
- Order: Squamata
- Family: Scincidae
- Genus: Cryptoblepharus
- Species: C. nigropunctatus

Binomial name
- Cryptoblepharus nigropunctatus (Hallowell, 1861)

= Cryptoblepharus nigropunctatus =

Species of lizard

Cryptoblepharus nigropunctatus, known as the Ogasawara snake-eyed skink, is a species of lizard in the family Scincidae. It is endemic to the Bonin Islands of Japan.
