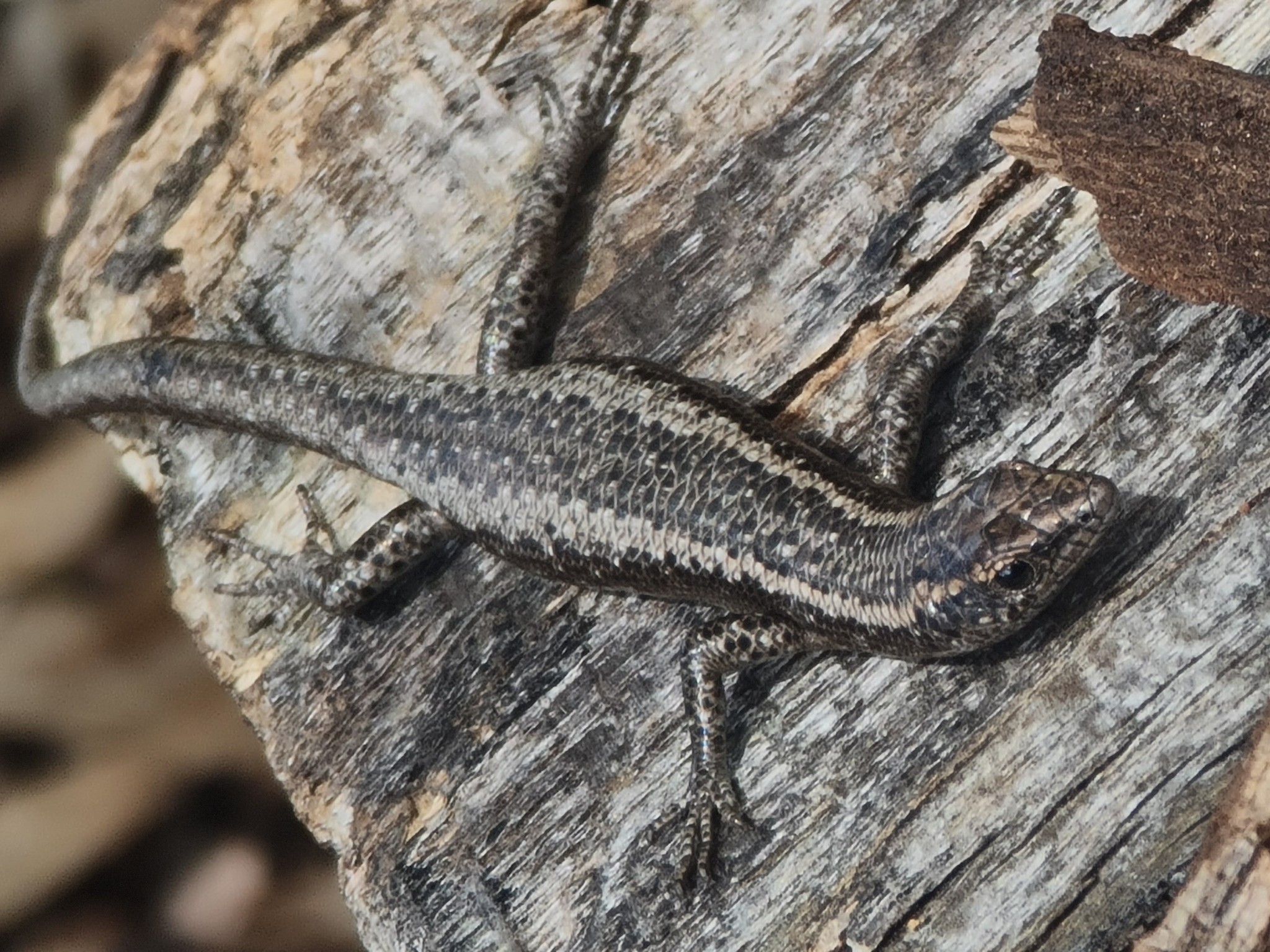

Conservation status
- Least Concern (IUCN 3.1)

Scientific classification
- Kingdom: Animalia
- Phylum: Chordata
- Class: Reptilia
- Order: Squamata
- Family: Scincidae
- Genus: Cryptoblepharus
- Species: C. pannosus

Binomial name
- Cryptoblepharus pannosus Horner, 2007

= Cryptoblepharus pannosus =

Species of lizard

Cryptoblepharus pannosus, also known commonly as the ragged snake-eyed skink, is a species of lizard in the family Scincidae. The species is endemic to Australia.

== Geographic range ==
Within Australia, C. pannosus is found in New South Wales, Northern Territory, Queensland, South Australia, Victoria and the Australian Capital Territory.

== Habitat ==
C. pannosus are very agile climbers, and because of this they are mainly arboreal and extremely versatile, they can be found living under rocks and logs. C. pannosus can also live in or under human structures, including fences and walls throughout Eastern Australia. C. pannosus also occur in a variety of habitats, including forest, shrubland, and grassland.

== Description ==
Medium-sized for its genus and short-legged for its genus, as an adult C. pannosus has a snout-to-vent length (SVL) of 4.0–4.4 cm (1.6–1.7 in). C. pannosus has a longitudinally-aligned pattern, with usually 5 supraciliary scales, pale, acute plantar scales, strongly keeled sub digital lamellae, 43–56 (modally 48) paravertebral scales, and relatively short limbs. Brown, grey to blackish with variable, complex ragged pattern including broad dark vertebral zone 3–4 scales wide, dark flecks aligning to form two narrow broken dorsal stripes and ragged, broad pale grey to cream laterodorsal stripes. C. pannosus is able to drop its tail when threatened and can regrow it in 6–12 months.

== Reproduction ==
C. pannosus is oviparous, and breeding is year round. Males mature at approximately 30.0 mm (1.18 in) snout-vent length and females at mm 30.4 mm (1.20 in).
