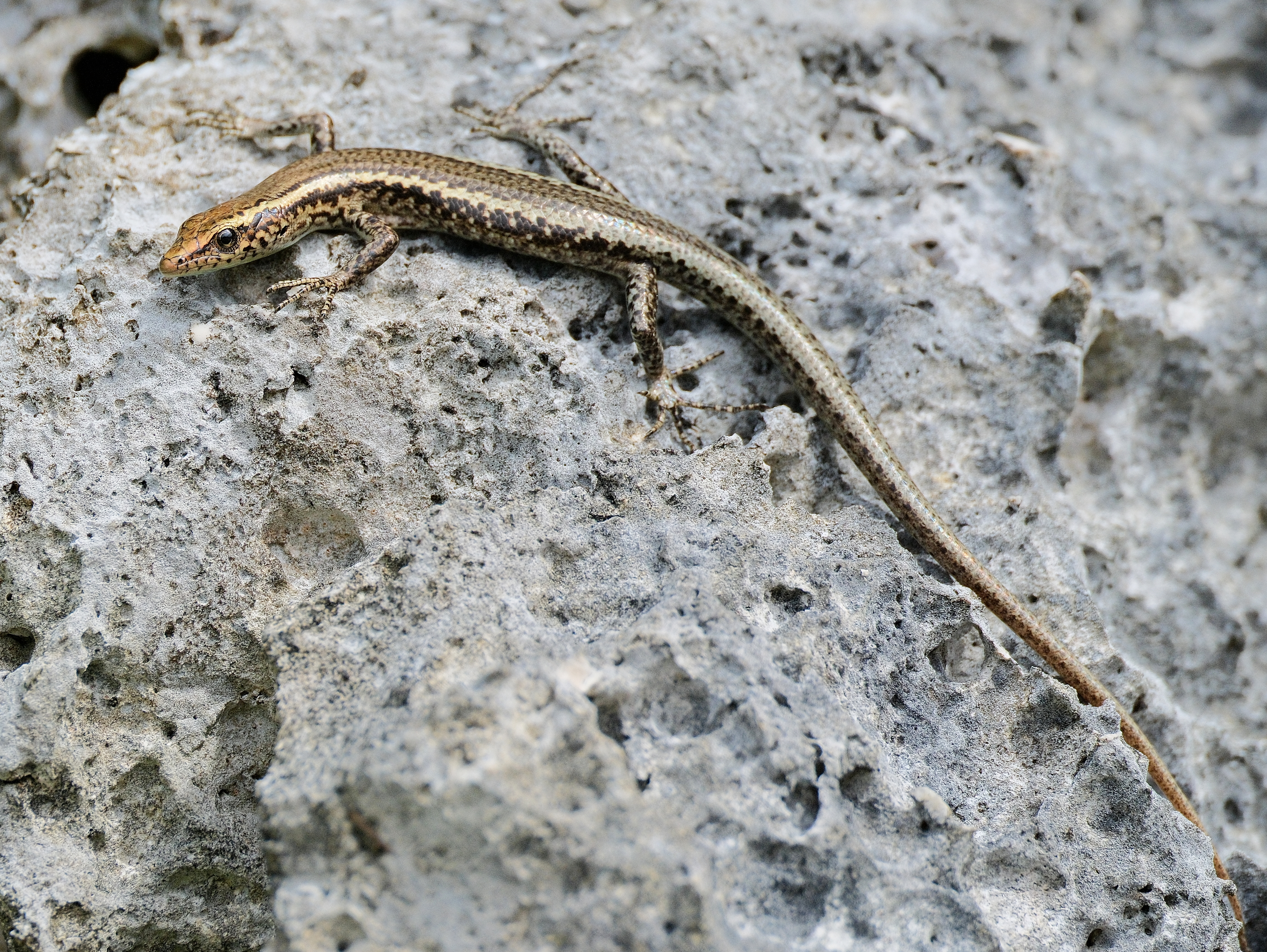
- Cryptoblepharus poecilopleurus seen in Niue

Conservation status
- Least Concern (IUCN 3.1)

Scientific classification
- Kingdom: Animalia
- Phylum: Chordata
- Class: Reptilia
- Order: Squamata
- Family: Scincidae
- Genus: Cryptoblepharus
- Species: C. poecilopleurus

Binomial name
- Cryptoblepharus poecilopleurus (Wiegmann, 1836)

= Cryptoblepharus poecilopleurus =

Species of lizard

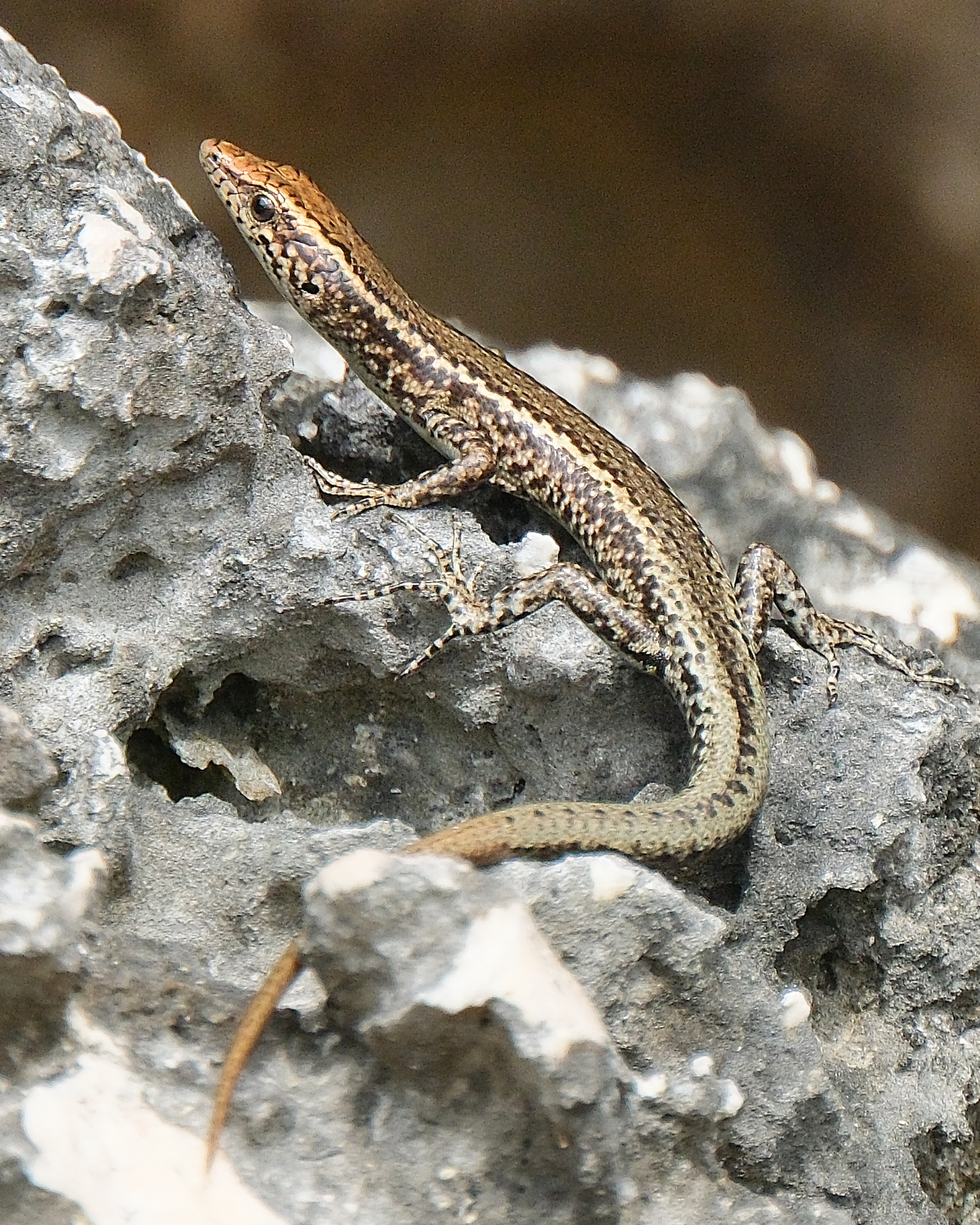
Cryptoblepharus poecilopleurus on a rock

Cryptoblepharus poecilopleurus, the mottled snake-eyed skink or Oceania snake-eyed skink, is a species of lizard in the family Scincidae. It is found throughout Oceania.
