= Cryptoblepharus ruber =

Conservation status
- Least Concern (IUCN 3.1)

Scientific classification
- Kingdom: Animalia
- Phylum: Chordata
- Class: Reptilia
- Order: Squamata
- Family: Scincidae
- Genus: Cryptoblepharus
- Species: C. ruber

Binomial name
- Cryptoblepharus ruber Börner & Schüttler, 1981

Species of lizard

Cryptoblepharus ruber, also known as the tawny snake-eyed skink, is a species of lizard in the family Scincidae. It is endemic to Western Australia and Northern Territory.
