= Cryptoblepharus aldabrae =

Scientific classification
- Kingdom: Animalia
- Phylum: Chordata
- Class: Reptilia
- Order: Squamata
- Family: Scincidae
- Genus: Cryptoblepharus
- Species: C. aldabrae

Binomial name
- Cryptoblepharus aldabrae (Sternfeld, 1918)

Species of lizard

Cryptoblepharus aldabrae is a species of lizard in the family Scincidae. It is endemic to the Aldabra Islands.
