= Binerah Downs =

Defunct pastoral lease in New South Wales

Binerah Downs is one of seven former cattle stations located within the Sturt National Park. There Binehrah Downs is 1,060 km (660 mi) north west of Sydney, Australia at an elevation of 156 m (512 ft) above sea level.
