= Jean-Théodore Cocteau =

French herpetologist

Jean-Théodore Cocteau (1798–1838) was a French herpetologist, who was associated with Duméril, Cuvier, and Bibron, and corresponded with other workers in zoology around the world. Cocteau published a volume on skinks, Etudes sur les Scincoïdes, and named a number of new taxa. Cocteau is commemorated in the scientific name of a species of giant skink, Chioninia coctei, which is now extinct.
