= Robert Mertens =

German herpetologist

Robert Friedrich Wilhelm Mertens (1 December 1894 – 23 August 1975) was a German herpetologist. Several taxa of reptiles are named after him. He postulated Mertensian mimicry.

Mertens was born in Saint Petersburg, Russia. He moved to Germany in 1912, where he earned a doctorate in zoology from the University of Leipzig in 1915. During World War I, he served in the German army.

Mertens worked at the Senckenberg Museum in Frankfurt for many years, beginning as an assistant in 1919, and retiring as director emeritus in 1960. He also became a lecturer at Goethe University Frankfurt in 1932, and became a Professor there in 1939. Both jobs provided him with ample time for extensive travel and the study of lizards. He collected specimens in 30 countries.

During World War II, he evacuated most of the collections of the Senckenberg Museum to small towns. He also had German soldiers who were fighting overseas collect and ship specimens to him.

He was the author of several books on zoology, including La Vie des Amphibiens et Reptiles (1959). Mertens described at least 64 reptile species, and numerous amphibian species.

Nine species and two subspecies of reptiles have been named after Mertens: Amblyrhynchus cristatus mertensi (San Cristóbal Marine Iguana), Amphisbaena roberti (Robert's worm lizard), Chalcides mertensi (Algerian three-toed skink), Cryptoblepharus mertensi (Mertens' snake-eyed skink), Erythrolamprus mertensi (Mertens' tropical forest snake), Liolaemus robertmertensi (Robert's tree iguana), Micrurus mertensi (Mertens' coral snake), Phalotris mertensi (Mertens' lizard-eating snake), Phelsuma robertmertensi (Mertens' day gecko), Tropidoclonion lineatum mertensi (Mertens' lined snake), and Varanus mertensi (Mertens' water monitor). Also Vanderhorstia mertensi (Mertens' shrimp goby) has been named after him.

Mertens died after being bitten while feeding his pet savanna twigsnake, Thelotornis capensis. Because no applicable antivenom existed at that time, he suffered for 18 days before dying. He kept a diary of his deteriorating condition, noting that it was the "für einen Herpetologen einzig angemessene Ende" (the only appropriate demise for a herpetologist).

The death of Robert Mertens parallels that of another well known herpetologist, Karl Patterson Schmidt, almost 20 years earlier. Each was a herpetologist, each was bitten by a venomous colubrid native to Africa, and each documented his symptoms until his death.
