= Cornufer heffernani =

Conservation status
- Least Concern (IUCN 3.1)

Scientific classification
- Kingdom: Animalia
- Phylum: Chordata
- Class: Amphibia
- Order: Anura
- Family: Ceratobatrachidae
- Genus: Cornufer
- Species: C. heffernani

Binomial name
- Cornufer heffernani (Kinghorn, 1928)
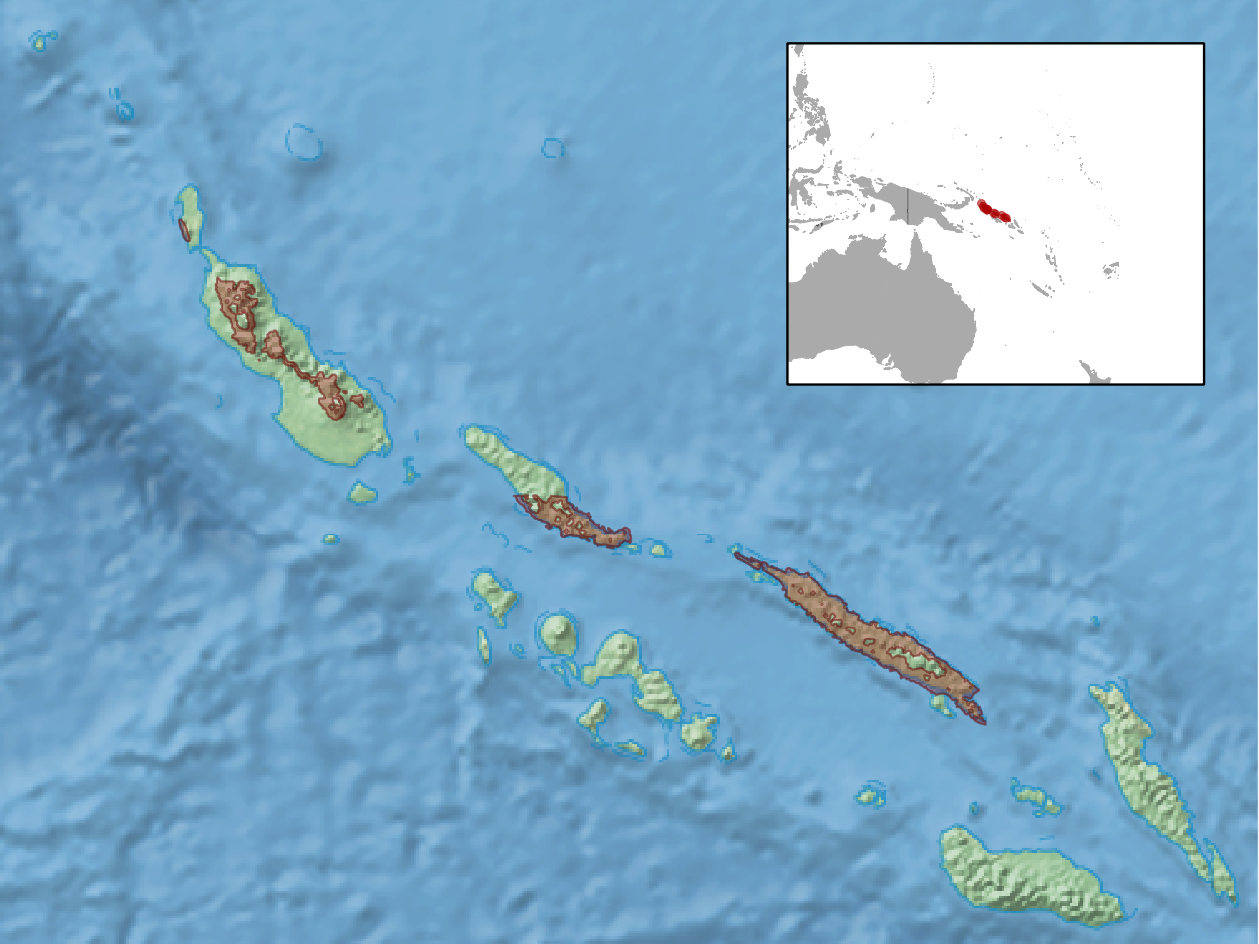

Synonyms
- Hylella solomonis Sternfeld, 1920 — secondary homonym of Cornufer solomonis Boulenger, 1884; Palmatorappia solomonis (Sternfeld, 1920); Hypsirana heffernani Kinghorn, 1928

Species of amphibian

Cornufer heffernani, sometimes known as the Solomon Island palm frog, is a species of frog in the family Ceratobatrachidae. It is endemic to the Solomon Islands archipelago where it can be found in at least Buka and Bougainville Islands of Papua New Guinea and Choiseul and Santa Isabel Islands of the Solomon Islands, but probably also more widely. The specific name heffernani honours Mr. N. S. Heffernan, who collected the type series.

== Taxonomy ==
Cornufer heffernani was until 2015 known as Palmatorappia solomonis, the sole species of the genus Palmatorappia. In a major revision of family Ceratobatrachidae, Brown and colleagues moved P. solomonis to the genus Cornufer, leading to secondary homonymy with Cornufer solomonis. They solved this issue by resurrecting Cornufer heffernani as a substitute name. Palmatorappia could still be recognized as a monotypic subgenus Cornufer (Palmatorappia).

== Description ==
Cornufer heffernani has a small, delicate, slender body and limbs. A syntype specimen of Hylella solomonis in the Senckenberg Museum measures 28 mm (1.1 in) in snout–vent length. The head is broader than the body and triangular in shape. The snout is broadly rounded and the eyes are large. The canthus rostralis and the tympanum are indistinct. The limbs are slender. Both the fingers and the toes are webbed and bear well-developed discs. Skin is smooth above but granular on the flanks, the belly, and under surface of the upper arm and thighs. Preserved specimens are purplish brown above and yellow below, fading to yellowish all over with time.

== Habitat and conservation ==
Cornufer heffernani is a very rare species that is found on low vegetation and trees in tropical rain forests. It can also be found in good-quality secondary forests. It has direct development, that is, it breeds without free-living tadpole stage. It is threatened by habitat loss caused by logging.

== See also ==
- Solomon Island leaf frog (Ceratobatrachus guentheri)
