= Cornufer opisthodon =

Conservation status
- Least Concern (IUCN 3.1)

Scientific classification
- Kingdom: Animalia
- Phylum: Chordata
- Class: Amphibia
- Order: Anura
- Family: Ceratobatrachidae
- Genus: Cornufer
- Species: C. opisthodon

Binomial name
- Cornufer opisthodon (Boulenger, 1884)

Synonyms
- Rana opisthodon Boulenger, 1884; Discodeles opisthodon (Boulenger, 1884)

Species of frog

Cornufer opisthodon, commonly known as Faro webbed frog or Faro Island webbed frog, is a species of frog in the family Ceratobatrachidae. It is endemic to the Solomon Islands archipelago and is known from Bougainville Island of Papua New Guinea and Fauro, Kolombangara and Makira islands of the Solomon Islands, but probably occurs more widely. Very little specific is known about the biology of or threats to this species, presumed to inhabit stream sides in lowland forests.
