= Cornufer parkeri =

Conservation status
- Endangered (IUCN 3.1)

Scientific classification
- Kingdom: Animalia
- Phylum: Chordata
- Class: Amphibia
- Order: Anura
- Family: Ceratobatrachidae
- Genus: Cornufer
- Species: C. parkeri

Binomial name
- Cornufer parkeri Brown, 1965

Synonyms
- Platymantis parkeri (Brown, 1965)

Species of frog

Cornufer parkeri is a species of frog in the family Ceratobatrachidae. It is endemic to the Papua New Guinean part of the Solomon Islands archipelago and is only known from the islands of Bougainville and Buka. The specific name parkeri honors Fred Parker, Australian naturalist and explorer who collected the type series. Common name Parker's wrinkled ground frog has been proposed for this species.

== Distribution and subspecies ==
Two subspecies have been distinguished, each restricted to one island:

- Cornufer parkeri parkeri Brown, 1965 – northernmost Bougainville Island
- Cornufer parkeri bukanensis Brown, 1965 – Buka Island

On Bougainville Island, Cornufer parkeri is restricted to the northernmost part of the island because of the availability of uplifted coral landscapes it inhabits.

== Description ==
Cornufer parkeri is a small frog: adult males measure 14.0–15.9 mm (0.55–0.63 in) and adult females 15.1–18.5 mm (0.59–0.73 in) in snout–vent length. The overall appearance is slender. The eyes are large. The snout is pointed-rounded. The tympanum is large and distinct. The finger tips are blunt or slightly pointed, whereas the toes are rather pointed and slightly dilated. No webbing is present. In Cornufer parkeri parkeri, skin is rough and tuberculate. Preserved specimens vary from grayish brown to brown to brownish black. Specimens of lighter colors have irregular darker blotches. A tan, silvery, or whitish middorsal band is present in some individuals.

Cornufer parkeri bukanensis has much less warty skin, relatively larger eyes, and relatively broader head than the nominotypical subspecies. Coloration is uniformly purplish brown or with lighter blotches.

== Habitat and conservation ==
Cornufer parkeri occurs in uplifted coral landscapes at elevations below 100 m (330 ft). It is a terrestrial frog that can be found in lowland rainforest, regrowth forest, rural gardens, villages, and other anthropogenic habitats. Development is, presumably, direct (i.e., there is no free-living larval stage).

Cornufer parkeri is an adaptable species, but its range is very small, making it vulnerable to chance events. It is not known to occur in any protected areas.
