= Cornufer macrops =

Conservation status
- Least Concern (IUCN 3.1)

Scientific classification
- Kingdom: Animalia
- Phylum: Chordata
- Class: Amphibia
- Order: Anura
- Family: Ceratobatrachidae
- Genus: Cornufer
- Species: C. macrops

Binomial name
- Cornufer macrops Brown, 1965
- Cornufer macrops is only known from northern Bougainville Island, Papua New Guinea

Synonyms
- Platymantis macrops (Brown, 1965)

Species of frog

Cornufer macrops, also known as the Aresi wrinkled ground frog, is a species of frog in the family Ceratobatrachidae. The specific name macrops refers to the very large eyes of this species. It is endemic to Bougainville Island, in the Papua New Guinean part of the Solomon Islands archipelago. It is only known from the mountains of northern Bougainville Island, near Kunua, although its true range could be much wider.

== Description ==
Based on three adult males and two adult females, males measure 23.2–25.9 mm (0.9–1.0 in) and females 26–28.5 mm (1.0–1.1 in) in snout–vent length. The overall appearance is slender. The eyes are very large. The snout is rounded. The tympanum is distinct. The finger and the toe tips have slightly dilated, rounded discs, or in the case toe tips, they may be slightly pointed. No webbing is present. Preserved specimens are blotched light and dark brown. The hind limbs have dark crossbars.

== Habitat and conservation ==
Cornufer macrops occurs on steep mountain slopes in dense forest and along streams, but not on ridge tops, at elevations of 700–1,000 m (2,300–3,300 ft) above sea level. Development is direct (i.e., there is no free-living larval stage) and the eggs are laid on the ground.

Cornufer macrops is an uncommon species. There is no recent information on it, but it is not believed to be facing significant threats.
