= Cornufer acrochordus =

Conservation status
- Least Concern (IUCN 3.1)

Scientific classification
- Kingdom: Animalia
- Phylum: Chordata
- Class: Amphibia
- Order: Anura
- Family: Ceratobatrachidae
- Genus: Cornufer
- Species: C. acrochordus

Binomial name
- Cornufer acrochordus Brown, 1965

Synonyms
- Platymantis acrochordus (Brown, 1965)

Species of frog

Cornufer acrochordus, also known as the Bougainville wrinkled ground frog, is a species of frog in the family Ceratobatrachidae. It is endemic to the Solomon Islands archipelago and occurs on Bougainville (Papua New Guinea), Choiseul, and Santa Isabel Islands (Solomon Islands), although its distribution in the archipelago is not properly known. The specific name acrochordus is Greek for "warty" and refers to the warty skin of this species.

== Description ==
Adult males measure 25–28 mm (1.0–1.1 in) and adult females 37–40 mm (1.5–1.6 in) in snout–vent length. The overall appearance is moderately broad and depressed. The eyes are moderately large. The snout is broadly rounded. The tympanum is distinct. The finger tips are round-pointed to pointed. The toe tips are pointed and slightly dilated. No webbing is present. Dorsal surfaces of the body and the limbs bear prominent, roundish tubercles. The dorsum also has some elongated folds. The venter bears coarse, rounded granules. Preserved specimens are dorsally grayish to black, usually mottled with a broad occipital patch. blotched light and dark brown. The limbs have light and dark crossbars. Lips have dark bars.

== Habitat and conservation ==
Cornufer acrochordus occurs at elevations of 700–1,500 m (2,300–4,900 ft) above sea level on Bougainville and at 100–200 m (330–660 ft), possibly higher, on Choiseul and Isabel. The lowland locations were in tropical rainforest where the frogs were active at night on the forest floor, whereas the Bougainville specimens were found on cliffs in steep mountains, and in cracks and fissures in the ground. Development is direct (i.e., there is no free-living larval stage) and the eggs are laid in fissures.

Cornufer acrochordus is generally rare and hard to find. It is potentially threatened by logging.
