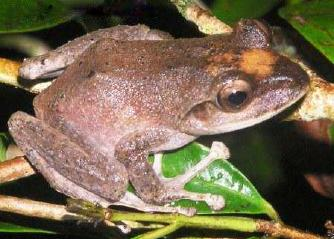
- Cornufer vitiensis in Fiji

Scientific classification
- Kingdom: Animalia
- Phylum: Chordata
- Class: Amphibia
- Order: Anura
- Family: Ceratobatrachidae
- Subfamily: Ceratobatrachinae
- Genus: Cornufer; Tschudi, 1838

Synonyms
- Batrachylodes Boulenger, 1887; Ceratobatrachus Boulenger, 1884; Discodeles Boulenger, 1918; Palmatorappia Ahl, 1927

Audio
- Recording of C. pelewensis in Palau

= Cornufer =

Genus of amphibians

Cornufer is a genus of frogs in the family Ceratobatrachidae. It has been greatly expanded by Brown, et al. (2015) to include most Australasian frogs in the family Ceratobatrachidae. Species are found in Melanesia and Polynesia — in Palau, Fiji, New Guinea, and in the Admiralty, Bismarck, and Solomon Islands.

== Species ==
There are currently at least 50 extant species in this genus.

- Cornufer acrochordus (Brown, 1965)
- Cornufer aculeodactylus (Brown, 1952)
- Cornufer adiastolus (Brown, Richards, Sukumaran, and Foufopoulos, 2006)
- Cornufer admiraltiensis (Richards, Mack & Austin, 2007)
- Cornufer akarithymus (Brown & Tyler, 1968)
- Cornufer batantae (Zweifel, 1969)
- Cornufer bimaculatus (Günther, 1999)
- Cornufer boulengeri (Boettger, 1892)
- Cornufer browni (Allison & Kraus, 2001)
- Cornufer bufoniformis (Boulenger, 1884)
- Cornufer bufonulus (Kraus and Allison, 2007)
- Cornufer caesiops (Kraus and Allison, 2009)
- Cornufer cheesmanae (Parker, 1940)
- Cornufer citrinospilus (Brown, Richards, and Broadhead, 2013)
- Cornufer cryptotis (Günther, 1999)
- Cornufer custos (Richards, Oliver, and Brown, 2015)
- Cornufer desticans (Brown & Richards, 2008)
- Cornufer elegans (Brown and Parker, 1970)
- Cornufer exedrus (Travers, Richards, Broadhead, and Brown, 2018)
- Cornufer gigas (Brown and Parker, 1970)
- Cornufer gilliardi (Zweifel, 1960)
- Cornufer guentheri (Boulenger, 1884)
- Cornufer guppyi (Boulenger, 1884)
- Cornufer hedigeri (Brown, Siler, Richards, Diesmos, and Cannatella, 2015)
- Cornufer heffernani (Kinghorn, 1928)
- Cornufer latro (Richards, Mack & Austin, 2007)
- Cornufer macrops (Brown, 1965)
- Cornufer macrosceles (Zweifel, 1975)
- Cornufer magnus (Brown & Menzies, 1979)
- Cornufer malukuna (Brown and Webster, 1969)
- Cornufer mamusiorum (Foufopoulos and Brown, 2004)
- Cornufer manus (Kraus and Allison, 2009)
- Cornufer mediodiscus (Brown and Parker, 1970)
- Cornufer mimicus (Brown & Tyler, 1968)
- Cornufer minutus (Brown and Parker, 1970)
- Cornufer montanus (Brown and Parker, 1970)
- Cornufer myersi (Brown, 1949)
- Cornufer nakanaiorum (Brown, Foufopoulos, and Richards, 2006)
- Cornufer neckeri (Brown & Myers, 1949)
- Cornufer nexipus (Zweifel, 1975)
- Cornufer opisthodon (Boulenger, 1884)
- Cornufer paepkei (Günther, 2015)
- Cornufer papuensis (Meyer, 1875)
- Cornufer parilis (Brown & Richards, 2008)
- Cornufer parkeri (Brown, 1965)
- Cornufer pelewensis (Peters, 1867)
- Cornufer punctatus (Peters & Doria, 1878)
- Cornufer schmidti (Brown & Tyler, 1968)
- Cornufer solomonis (Boulenger, 1884)
- Cornufer sulcatus (Kraus and Allison, 2007)
- Cornufer trossulus (Brown and Myers, 1949)
- Cornufer vertebralis (Boulenger, 1887)
- Cornufer vitianus (Duméril, 1853)
- Cornufer vitiensis (Girard, 1853)
- Cornufer vogti (Hediger, 1934)
- Cornufer weberi (Schmidt, 1932)
- Cornufer wolfi (Sternfeld, 1920)
- Cornufer wuenscheorum (Günther, 2006)
