= Cornufer gilliardi =

Conservation status
- Near Threatened (IUCN 3.1)

Scientific classification
- Kingdom: Animalia
- Phylum: Chordata
- Class: Amphibia
- Order: Anura
- Family: Ceratobatrachidae
- Genus: Cornufer
- Species: C. gilliardi

Binomial name
- Cornufer gilliardi (Zweifel, 1960)

Synonyms
- Platymantis gilliardi Zweifel, 1960

Species of frog

Cornufer gilliardi, commonly known as Gilliard's wrinkled ground frog, is a species of frog in the family Ceratobatrachidae. It is endemic to the Whiteman Ranges of New Britain, Bismarck Archipelago (Papua New Guinea). The specific name gilliardi honors Ernest Thomas Gilliard, an American ornithologist who, together with Margaret Gilliard, collected the holotype .

== Taxonomy ==
Cornufer gilliardi was originally described as Platymantis gilliardi based on holotype from New Britain and paratypes from the Admiralty Archipelago. Later research has shown that the Admiralty Archipelago specimens represent other species, Platymantis latro (now Cornufer latro), and that the range of Cornufer gilliardi is restricted to New Britain.

== Description ==
The holotype is an adult female measuring 44 mm (1.7 in) in snout–vent length. The tympanum and the supratympanic fold are moderately distinct. The eyes are relatively large. The fingers have lateral fringes but no discs. The toes have small terminal discs. The preserved specimen is dorsally gray-brown, slightly paler between the convergent dorsal folds. The chest and abdomen are pale and nearly immaculate.

== Habitat and conservation ==
The ecology of Cornufer gilliardi is poorly known. It is probably a foothill species occurring in rainforest habitats. The holotype was collected at 460 m (1,500 ft) above sea level. Development is direct (i.e., there is no free-living larval stage) and the eggs are laid on the ground.

The very extensive logging taking place within its range is a possible threat.
