= Cornufer wolfi =

Conservation status
- Vulnerable (IUCN 3.1)

Scientific classification
- Kingdom: Animalia
- Phylum: Chordata
- Class: Amphibia
- Order: Anura
- Family: Ceratobatrachidae
- Genus: Cornufer
- Species: C. wolfi

Binomial name
- Cornufer wolfi (Sternfeld, 1920)

Synonyms
- Sphenophryne wolfi Sternfeld, 1920; Batrachylodes wolfi (Sternfeld, 1920)

Species of frog

Cornufer wolfi is a species of frog in the family Ceratobatrachidae. It is endemic to the Solomon Islands archipelago and known from the Buka and Bougainville Islands in Papua New Guinea and from the Santa Isabel and Choiseul Islands in the Solomon Islands. The specific name wolfi honours Eugen Wolf, a member of the Hanseatische Südsee-Expedition (1909) and writer of the expedition's travel report. Common name Wolf's sticky-toed frog has been coined for it.

== Description ==
Adult males measure 25–31 mm (1.0–1.2 in) and adult females 28–32 mm (1.1–1.3 in) in snout–vent length. The finger tips are dilated into broad discs; the toes have less broad discs and have minute webbing at their base. The dorsum is relatively uniform olive green. A blackish band runs from the tip of the snout through the eye and the tympanum to the post-axillary region. The venter is creamy. Melanistic specimens are dark brown with brownish venter. The iris is reddish.

== Habitat and conservation ==
Cornufer wolfi occurs in lowland and hill rainforests at elevations below 700 m (2,300 ft). It prefers primary forest but can be found on the forest edge and in wild banana plants. It is an arboreal species that lays its eggs in leaves in trees some two meters above the ground. The eggs develop directly into froglets, without free-living tadpole stage.

It is threatened by logging. There are no protected areas within its known range.
