= Cornufer schmidti =

Conservation status
- Least Concern (IUCN 3.1)

Scientific classification
- Kingdom: Animalia
- Phylum: Chordata
- Class: Amphibia
- Order: Anura
- Family: Ceratobatrachidae
- Genus: Cornufer
- Species: C. schmidti

Binomial name
- Cornufer schmidti (Brown and Tyler, 1968)

Synonyms
- Platymantis papuensis schmidti Brown and Tyler, 1968; Platymantis schmidti Brown and Tyler, 1968

Species of frog

Cornufer schmidti is a species of frog in the family Ceratobatrachidae. It was first described as a subspecies of Platymantis papuensis (now Cornufer papuensis). It is the type species of the subgenus Aenigmanura within Cornufer. It is endemic to the Bismarck Archipelago, Papua New Guinea, and is known from the islands of New Britain, New Ireland, and Manus; the Manus population might represent a distinct species.

== Etymology ==
Cornufer schmidti is named after Karl Patterson Schmidt, American herpetologist. Common name Schmidt's wrinkled ground frog has been coined for it.

== Description ==
Adult males measure 30–40 mm (1.2–1.6 in) and adult females 40–60 mm (1.6–2.4 in) in snout–vent length. The snout is rounded to broadly round-pointed. The tympanum is distinct and moderately large. The fingers tips are dilated into moderate, depressed discs. The toes are slightly webbed and have smaller discs than the fingers. Dorsal folds are moderate to short, usually scattered over the entire dorsum.

== Habitat and conservation ==
Cornufer schmidti occurs in lowland rainforests, disturbed forests, plantations, and gardens, often in association with coconut husk piles. Development is direct (i.e, there is no free-living larval stage). It is an abundant and adaptable species that seems not to be threatened. It is probably present in a number of protected areas.
