= Cornufer guppyi =

Conservation status
- Least Concern (IUCN 3.1)

Scientific classification
- Kingdom: Animalia
- Phylum: Chordata
- Class: Amphibia
- Order: Anura
- Family: Ceratobatrachidae
- Genus: Cornufer
- Subgenus: Cornufer (Discodeles)
- Species: C. guppyi

Binomial name
- Cornufer guppyi (Boulenger, 1884)

Synonyms
- Rana guppyi Boulenger, 1884 Discodeles guppyi Boulenger, 1884

Species of frog

Cornufer guppyi (common name: Shortland Island webbed frog or giant webbed frog) is a species of frog in the family Ceratobatrachidae. The species is named after British surgeon Henry B. Guppy who collected the holotype from the Shortland Islands. It is found in New Britain Island (Papua New Guinea) and in the Solomon Islands archipelago, where it is widespread, though it is missing from Makira island (San Cristobal).

== Taxonomy ==
Cornufer guppyi is the type species and the sole representative of the subgenus Discodeles (formerly recognized as a genus).

== Description ==
Cornufer guppyi is a large species of frog, with females growing as large as 250 mm (9.8 in) in snout–vent length and a weight of 1 kg (2.2 lb). The snout is rounded. The tympanum is round. The fingers and toes have moderately expanded terminal discs. The toes are fully webbed. The legs are long. Males have external vocal sacs. Preserved specimens show variable colouration, from light tan/almost white to greyish to dark reddish brown, with various darker brown or blackish brown marbling or blotching. The venter is light tan or whitish, often with some brown blotches or speckles.

== Human interaction ==
Humans mostly use C. guppyi for food purposes, and it is tracked down by listening to its calls during rain, with March being said to be the best time to find it. A whistle is sometimes used to find this frog because it will respond to the noise, and it is said that snapping a twig will fool the frog into thinking one of its legs has been broken. The frog C. guppyi is considered to be a sign of soil fertility if seen in a garden, and the tribes who hold this belief do not typically eat it. Its bones are also sometimes ground up and applied to the skin to treat snake or centipede bites.

== Habitat and conservation ==
Cornufer guppyi is a common species. It inhabits streams and small rivers in lowland rainforests up to elevations of 700 m (2,300 ft) above sea level. It also tolerates some habitat degradation and can be found in rural gardens and degraded forests. It is also known from caves. It can be locally impacted by habitat loss caused by logging, and by collection for human consumption and pet trade. It is also eaten by domestic dogs and cats.
