= Cornufer cheesmanae =

Conservation status
- Vulnerable (IUCN 3.1)

Scientific classification
- Kingdom: Animalia
- Phylum: Chordata
- Class: Amphibia
- Order: Anura
- Family: Ceratobatrachidae
- Genus: Cornufer
- Species: C. cheesmanae

Binomial name
- Cornufer cheesmanae (Parker, 1940)

Synonyms
- Platymantis cheesmanae Parker, 1940

Species of frog

Cornufer cheesmanae is a species of frog in the family Ceratobatrachidae. It is endemic to New Guinea and found in the Cyclops Mountains (Papua, Indonesia) and Bewani Mountains (Papua New Guinea). The specific name cheesmanae honors Lucy Evelyn Cheesman, an English entomologist, explorer, and curator at London Zoo. Common name Cheesman's wrinkled ground frog has been coined for it.

== Description ==
Cornufer cheesmanae is the smallest species of its genus in New Guinea: adult males can grow to 23 mm (0.9 in) and adult females to 27 mm (1.1 in) in snout–vent length. It is morphologically similar to Cornufer wuenscheorum, but is even smaller. The first finger is shorter than second one. The inner metatarsal tubercle is relatively shorter in Cornufer cheesmanae. The male advertisement call consists of a single note, instead of double notes as in Cornufer wuenscheorum. The dominant frequency is about 3300 Hz. Call series can last tens of seconds, during which the emission rate increases.

== Habitat and conservation ==
Little is known about this inhabitant of hilly tropical rainforests. The type series from the Cyclops Range was collected at 910–1,220 m (3,000–4,000 ft) above sea level, whereas the Bewani Mountains record is from 210 m (690 ft) above sea level. The eggs are laid on the ground and development is direct, without free-living tadpole stage.

The threats to Cornufer cheesmanae are unknown. Its range includes Cyclops Mountains Nature Reserve, but fires and illegal removal of vegetation are encroaching on this habitat.
