= Cornufer malukuna =

Conservation status
- Least Concern (IUCN 3.1)

Scientific classification
- Kingdom: Animalia
- Phylum: Chordata
- Class: Amphibia
- Order: Anura
- Family: Ceratobatrachidae
- Genus: Cornufer
- Subgenus: Cornufer (Potamorana)
- Species: C. malukuna

Binomial name
- Cornufer malukuna (Brown and Webster, 1969)

Synonyms
- Discodeles malukuna Brown and Webster, 1969

Species of frog

Cornufer malukuna, commonly known as the Malukuna webbed frog, is a species of frog in the family Ceratobatrachidae. It is endemic to Guadalcanal Island, Solomon Islands. The specific name malukuna refers to its type locality, Malukuna.

== Description ==
Adult males measure 43–58 mm (1.7–2.3 in) in snout–vent length; adult females are unknown but measure at least 63 mm (2.5 in), based on a specimen undergoing maturation. The head is relatively broad and the eyes relatively large. The tympanum is visible. The fingers have bluntly rounded tips but no webbing. The toes have rounded, moderately dilated and depressed tips and reduced webbing. Skin is smooth but there is a pair of urn-shaped folds behind the eyes. Preserved specimens are dorsally grayish brown to blackish brown; the flanks and the limbs are lighter. There are black marking in the upper loreal region, borders of eyelids, upper tympanum, and edges of folds. The venter is grayish brown to blackish and usually has numerous white spots.

== Habitat and conservation ==
The type locality is in the central mountains of Guadalcanal at about 760 m (2,500 ft) above sea level. This species has not been recorded again since its discovery in 1968, although there have been no recent surveys either. Little is known about this species presumed to live near streams in montane tropical rainforest. Generally speaking, species in the subgenus Potamorana are semiaquatic.
