= Cornufer punctatus =

Conservation status
- Least Concern (IUCN 3.1)

Scientific classification
- Kingdom: Animalia
- Phylum: Chordata
- Class: Amphibia
- Order: Anura
- Family: Ceratobatrachidae
- Genus: Cornufer
- Species: C. punctatus

Binomial name
- Cornufer punctatus (Peters and Doria, 1878)

Synonyms
- Platymantis punctata Peters and Doria, 1878; Cornufer beauforti Van Kampen, 1913; Platymantis beauforti (Van Kampen, 1913)

Species of frog

Cornufer punctatus, commonly known as the dotted wrinkled ground frog, is a species of frog in the family Ceratobatrachidae. It is endemic to Western New Guinea (Indonesia) and occurs in the Arfak and Wondiwoi Mountains on the New Guinea mainland well as on some adjacent islands (Batanta and Waigeo).

== Description ==
Adult males can grow to 51 mm (2.0 in) and adult females to 79 mm (3.1 in) in snout–vent length. Dorsal skin is relatively smooth, apart from the supratympanic fold. The fingers and the toes bear enlarged and grooved discs. The toes are one-third to one-half webbed. In preserved specimens, the dorsal surfaces are almost patternless dark brown. The facial area is darker brown and has broad, vertical bars on the upper lip that become less distinct on the lower lip. The sides of the body are lightly mottled and the groin is more heavily mottled. Much finer mottling is present on the posterior surfaces of the thighs, whereas the under sides of the tibias are heavily mottled. Other ventral surfaces are pale and nearly patternless, apart from the faint grayish mottling on the chin.

== Habitat and conservation ==
Platymantis punctatus occurs in rainforest at elevations below 600 m (2,000 ft), usually near streams. Development is direct, without free-living tadpole stage.

Platymantis punctatus is a not a common species. No overall threats to it are unknown, although logging can impact it locally. Its range includes Wandamen Nature Reserve and Batanta Nature Reserve.
