= Cornufer elegans =

Conservation status
- Least Concern (IUCN 3.1)

Scientific classification
- Kingdom: Animalia
- Phylum: Chordata
- Class: Amphibia
- Order: Anura
- Family: Ceratobatrachidae
- Genus: Cornufer
- Species: C. elegans

Binomial name
- Cornufer elegans (Brown & Parker, 1970)

Synonyms
- Batrachylodes elegans Brown & Parker, 1970

Species of frog

Cornufer elegans is a species of frog in the family Ceratobatrachidae. It is endemic to Papua New Guinea.

Its natural habitats are subtropical or tropical moist lowland forests, plantations, rural gardens, urban areas, and heavily degraded former forest. Scientists first saw it between 2200 and 3200 feet above sea level.
