= Cornufer manus =

Conservation status
- Least Concern (IUCN 3.1)

Scientific classification
- Kingdom: Animalia
- Phylum: Chordata
- Class: Amphibia
- Order: Anura
- Family: Ceratobatrachidae
- Genus: Cornufer
- Species: C. manus

Binomial name
- Cornufer manus (Kraus and Allison, 2009)

Synonyms
- Platymantis manus Kraus and Allison, 2009; Cornufer manus Brown, Siler, Richards, Diesmos, and Cannatella, 2015

Species of frog

Cornufer manus is a species of frog in the family Ceratobatrachidae. It is endemic to the Nakanai Mountains on New Britain Island in Papua New Guinea.

== Original publication ==
- Fred Kraus; Allen Allison (2009). "New species of frogs from Papua New Guinea". Bishop Museum Occasional Papers (Abstract and figures). 104: 1–36.
