= Warty frog (disambiguation) =

The warty frog is a frog in the family Brevicipitidae found in Tanzania and Kenya.

Warty frog may also refer to:

- Kerala warty frog, a frog found in India
- Nepal warty frog, a frog found in India, Bangladesh, Nepal, and Bhutan
- Pied warty frog, a frog found in India, Burma, China, Thailand, Cambodia, Vietnam, and Indonesia
- Warty mountain stream frog, a frog endemic to the Sierra Juárez, Oaxaca, Mexico
- Warty swamp frog, a frog native to southeastern Australia
- Warty water-holding frog, a frog native to Australia
- Warty webbed frog, a frog endemic to the Solomon Islands

== See also ==
- Wart frog (disambiguation)
