= Hyalaethea metaphaea =

Scientific classification
- Kingdom: Animalia
- Phylum: Arthropoda
- Clade: Pancrustacea
- Class: Insecta
- Order: Lepidoptera
- Superfamily: Noctuoidea
- Family: Erebidae
- Subfamily: Arctiinae
- Genus: Hyalaethea
- Species: H. metaphaea

Binomial name
- Hyalaethea metaphaea H. Druce, 1898

Synonyms
- Hyalaethea georgiensis Rothschild, 1910

Species of moth

Hyalaethea metaphaea is a moth of the subfamily Arctiinae. It was described by Herbert Druce in 1898. It is found on the Solomon Islands.
