= Cornufer myersi =

Conservation status
- Least Concern (IUCN 3.1)

Scientific classification
- Kingdom: Animalia
- Phylum: Chordata
- Class: Amphibia
- Order: Anura
- Family: Ceratobatrachidae
- Genus: Cornufer
- Species: C. myersi

Binomial name
- Cornufer myersi (Brown, 1949)

Synonyms
- Platymantis myersi Brown, 1949

Species of frog

Cornufer myersi, commonly known as Myers' wrinkled ground frog, is a species of frog in the family Ceratobatrachidae. It is endemic to Papua New Guinea.

Its natural habitats are subtropical or tropical moist lowland forests and subtropical or tropical moist montane forests.
