= Cornufer batantae =

Conservation status
- Least Concern (IUCN 3.1)

Scientific classification
- Kingdom: Animalia
- Phylum: Chordata
- Class: Amphibia
- Order: Anura
- Family: Ceratobatrachidae
- Genus: Cornufer
- Species: C. batantae

Binomial name
- Cornufer batantae (Zweifel, 1969)

Synonyms
- Platymantis batantae Zweifel, 1969

Species of frog

Cornufer batantae is a species of frog in the family Ceratobatrachidae. It is endemic to West Papua, Indonesia, and is known from two islands near the New Guinean mainland, Batanta and Waigeo. There are also unconfirmed records from Yapen and Gag Islands. Common name Batanta wrinkled ground frog has been coined for the species.

== Description ==
Adult males measure 27–31 mm (1.1–1.2 in) and adult females 39–40 mm (1.5–1.6 in) in snout–vent length, based on two males and two females in the type series. The snout is bluntly pointed, and the canthus is distinct but rounded. The tympanum is distinct. The supratympanic fold is strong. The dorsal surfaces are finely tuberculate. The back bears several narrow, elongate, dermal folds. The ground color of the dorsal surfaces is light to dark brown. Indistinct darker bars and spots are present on the upper lip; the supratympanic fold and some dorsal skin folds are dark brown. However, this markings are not visible in the dark brown specimen, apart from the dark supratympanic mark. The hind limbs have indistinct dark cross bars. The ventral surfaces are pale.

The male advertisement call consist of a small number (4–8) of pulses, repeated at 132–226 pulses/s and lasting for 30–42 milliseconds.

== Habitat and conservation ==
Cornufer batantae is presumably a lowland forest species. The holotype was collected at 460 m (1,500 ft). Development is direct, without free-living tadpole stage. The eggs are laid on the ground.

Cornufer batantae is a poorly known species. On Waigeo, it is threatened by habitat loss caused by logging. It is not known to occur in any protected area.
