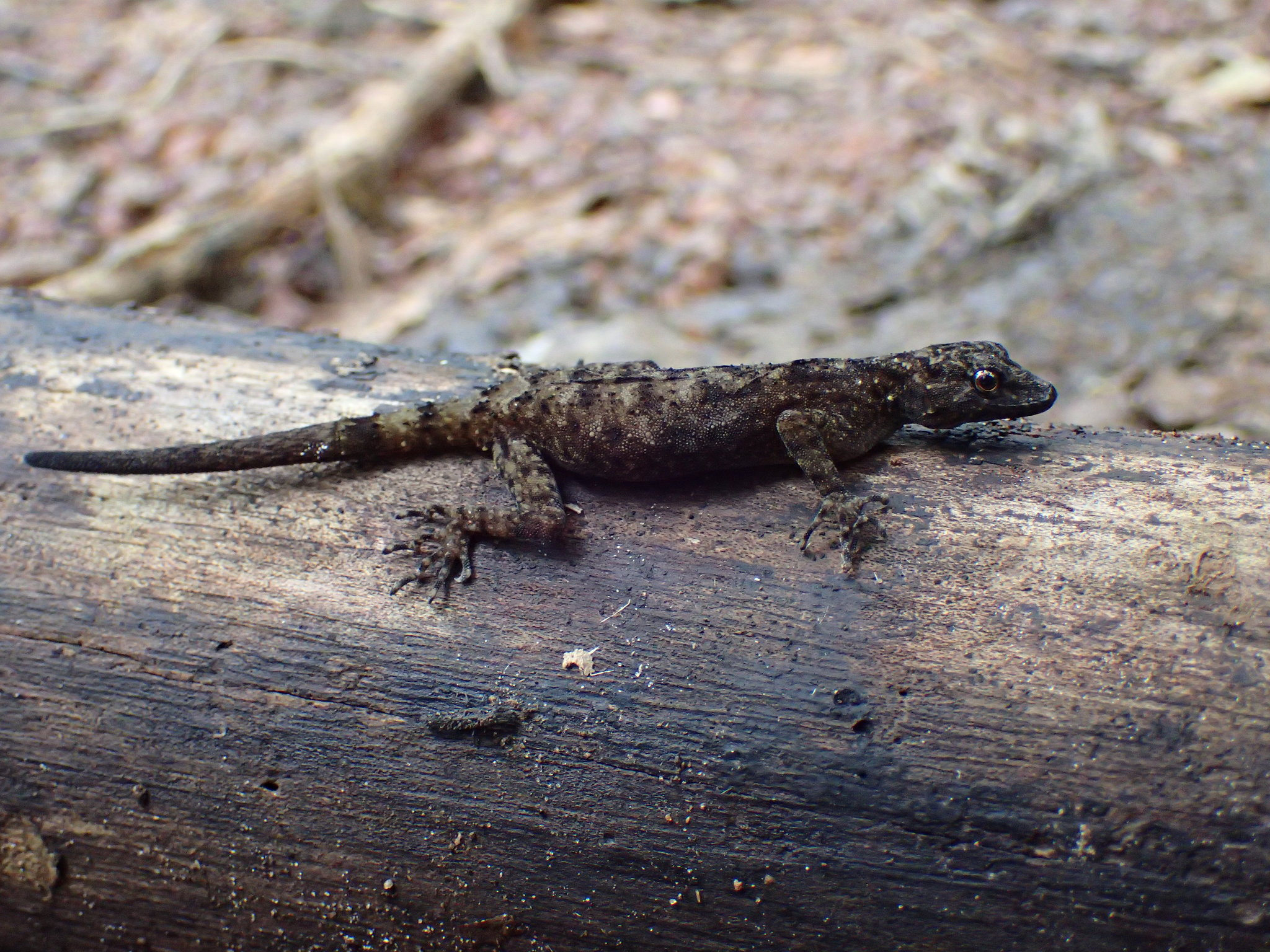

Scientific classification
- Kingdom: Animalia
- Phylum: Chordata
- Class: Reptilia
- Order: Squamata
- Suborder: Gekkota
- Family: Gekkonidae
- Subfamily: Gekkoninae
- Genus: Ancylodactylus; Müller, 1907

= Ancylodactylus =

Genus of lizards

Ancylodactylus is a genus of diurnal (day) geckos in the family Gekkonidae. The genus is endemic to Africa. Most of the species in the genus Ancyclodactylus were formerly assigned to the genus Cnemaspis.

== Species ==
- A. africanus (F. Werner, 1895) – African gecko
- A. alantika (Bauer, Chirio, Ineich & LeBreton, 2006)
- A. barbouri (Perret, 1986) – Barbour's gecko
- A. chyuluensis Malonza & Bauer, 2022
- A. dickersonae (Schmidt, 1919) – Dickerson's forest gecko, four-lined forest gecko
- A. dilepis (Perret, 1963) – two-scaled gecko
- A. elgonensis (Loveridge, 1936) – Mount Elgon forest gecko
- A. gigas (Perret, 1986) – Perret's Nigeria gecko, giant forest gecko
- A. kenyaensis Malonza & Bauer, 2022
- A. kituiensis Malonza & Bauer, 2022
- A. koehleri (Mertens, 1937) – Koehler's gecko
- A. laikipiensis Malonza & Bauer, 2022
- A. mathewsensis Malonza & Bauer, 2022
- A. occidentalis (Angel, 1943) – western gecko
- A. petrodroma (Perret, 1986) – Nigeria crag gecko, Ondo forest gecko
- A. quattuorseriatus (Sternfeld, 1912) – Sternfeld's gecko
- A. spawlsi Malonza & Bauer, 2022
- A. spinicollis L. Müller, 1907
- A. uzungwae (Perret, 1986) – Tanzania gecko

Nota bene: A binomial authority in parentheses indicates that the species was originally described in a genus other than Ancyclodactylus.
