= Cornufer citrinospilus =

Scientific classification
- Kingdom: Animalia
- Phylum: Chordata
- Class: Amphibia
- Order: Anura
- Family: Ceratobatrachidae
- Genus: Cornufer
- Species: C. citrinospilus

Binomial name
- Cornufer citrinospilus (Brown, Richards, and Broadhead, 2013)
- Cornufer citrinospilus is only known from eastern New Britain (Papua New Guinea)

Synonyms
- Platymantis citrinospilus Brown, Richards, and Broadhead, 2013

Species of frog

Cornufer citrinospilus is a species of frog in the family Ceratobatrachidae. It is endemic to the island of New Britain, Papua New Guinea, and is only known from the Nakanai Mountains of East New Britain Province. The specific name citrinospilus is derived from the Greek words kitrinos (="yellow") and pilos (="spot" or "stain"), in reference to the distinctive bright yellow flank areolations characteristic of this species.

== Description ==
Adult males measure 30–32 mm (1.2–1.3 in) in snout–vent length; females are unknown. The overall appearance is slender. The snout is moderate, bluntly round. The tympanum is distinct. The eyes protrude moderately beyond dorsal surface of the head in lateral aspect. The fingers and toes have widely expanded terminal disks but no webbing. Skin of dorsal surfaces is finely granular. The dorsum has dark brick reddish-brown ground coloration with extensive to nearly absent suffusion of light green pigment on upper surfaces of head, trunk and limbs. Juxtaposition with white dermal tubercles on dorsal surfaces gives an overall pale green lichenatious color results. A thin light cream to white vertebral stripe is present. The labial and postrictal region is bright immaculate white to yellow. The flanks and concealed posterior surfaces of the thighs have bold, bright yellow areolations. The ventrum is pale pink, with dark red throat.

The male advertisement call is slow series of dull, medium-frequency notes, which to the human ear resemble the sound produced by striking together two pieces of wood.

== Habitat and conservation ==
The type series was collected from a patch of mossy montane forest, surrounded by dense thickets of bamboo, at 1,650–1,700 m (5,410–5,580 ft) above sea level. Specimens were calling from elevated perches (leaves of small shrubs) some 0.3–1 m (1–3 ft) above the ground.

As of mid-2019, this species has not been included in the IUCN Red List of Threatened Species.
