= Cornufer nexipus =

Conservation status
- Vulnerable (IUCN 3.1)

Scientific classification
- Kingdom: Animalia
- Phylum: Chordata
- Class: Amphibia
- Order: Anura
- Family: Ceratobatrachidae
- Genus: Cornufer
- Species: C. nexipus

Binomial name
- Cornufer nexipus (Zweifel, 1975)

Synonyms
- Platymantis nexipus Zweifel, 1975

Species of frog

Cornufer nexipus, commonly known as the Baining wrinkled ground frog, is a species of frog in the family Ceratobatrachidae. It is endemic to Papua New Guinea.

Its natural habitat is subtropical or tropical moist lowland forests.
