= Cornufer caesiops =

Conservation status
- Data Deficient (IUCN 3.1)

Scientific classification
- Kingdom: Animalia
- Phylum: Chordata
- Class: Amphibia
- Order: Anura
- Family: Ceratobatrachidae
- Genus: Cornufer
- Species: C. caesiops

Binomial name
- Cornufer caesiops (Kraus and Allison, 2009)

Synonyms
- Platymantis caesiops Kraus and Allison, 2009; Cornufer caesiops Brown, Siler, Richards, Diesmos, and Cannatella, 2015

Species of frog

Cornufer caesiops is a species of frog in the family Ceratobatrachidae. It is endemic to the Nakanai Mountains on New Britain Island in Papua New Guinea.

== Original publication ==
- Fred Kraus; Allen Allison (2009). "New species of frogs from Papua New Guinea". Bishop Museum Occasional Papers (Abstract and figures). 104: 1–36.
