= Cornufer montanus =

Conservation status
- Least Concern (IUCN 3.1)

Scientific classification
- Kingdom: Animalia
- Phylum: Chordata
- Class: Amphibia
- Order: Anura
- Family: Ceratobatrachidae
- Genus: Cornufer
- Species: C. montanus

Binomial name
- Cornufer montanus (Brown & Parker, 1970)

Synonyms
- Batrachylodes montanus Brown & Parker, 1970

Species of frog

Cornufer montanus is a species of frog in the family Ceratobatrachidae. It is endemic to Papua New Guinea.

Its natural habitats are subtropical or tropical moist lowland forests and subtropical or tropical moist montane forests. It has been observed between 900 and 1250 meters above sea level. It is threatened by habitat loss.
