= Cornufer adiastolus =

Conservation status
- Data Deficient (IUCN 3.1)

Scientific classification
- Kingdom: Animalia
- Phylum: Chordata
- Class: Amphibia
- Order: Anura
- Family: Ceratobatrachidae
- Genus: Cornufer
- Species: C. adiastolus

Binomial name
- Cornufer adiastolus (Brown, Richards, Sukumaran, and Foufopoulos, 2006)

Synonyms
- Platymantis adiastola Brown, Richards, Sukumaran, and Foufopoulos, 2006; Platymantis adiastolus Frost, 2008; Cornufer (Aenigmanura) adiastolus Brown, Siler, Richards, Diesmos, and Cannatella, 2015

Species of frog

Cornufer adiastolus is a species of frog in the family Ceratobatrachidae, endemic to New Britain Island in Papua New Guinea. Scientists first observed this frog in the Wanui River Valley, 310 meters above sea level.

== Original description ==
- Brown, Rafe M.; Richards, Stephen J.; Sukumaran, Jeet; Foufopoulos, Johannes (2006). "A new morphologically cryptic species of forest frog (genus Platymantis) from New Britain Island, Bismarck Archipelago". Zootaxa. 1334: 45–68. doi:10.11646/zootaxa.1334.1.3.
