= Cornufer paepkei =

Scientific classification
- Kingdom: Animalia
- Phylum: Chordata
- Class: Amphibia
- Order: Anura
- Family: Ceratobatrachidae
- Genus: Cornufer
- Species: C. paepkei

Binomial name
- Cornufer paepkei (Günther, 2015)

Synonyms
- Platymantis paepkei Günther, 2015; Cornufer paepkei Brown, Siler, Richards, Diesmos, and Cannatella, 2015

Species of frog

Cornufer paepkei is a species of frog in the family Ceratobatrachidae, endemic to rainforest habitat. Scientists know it exclusively from the type locality: the Fakfak Mountains in Indonesia, at between 400 and 860 meters above sea level.

The adult frog measures 21.6 to 31.4 mm in snout-urostyle length. Its voice sounds like a "low, short creak." There a small amount of webbed skin on its feet. The frog is yellow-brown in color with dark brown or black patterning. There are two yellow-white lines from its nose to its hind legs. The backs of the legs are red-brown in color. Other parts of the legs are almost purple. The ventrum is off-white.
