= Cornufer admiraltiensis =

Conservation status
- Least Concern (IUCN 3.1)

Scientific classification
- Kingdom: Animalia
- Phylum: Chordata
- Class: Amphibia
- Order: Anura
- Family: Ceratobatrachidae
- Genus: Cornufer
- Species: C. admiraltiensis

Binomial name
- Cornufer admiraltiensis (Richards, Mack, and Austin, 2007)

Synonyms
- Platymantis admiraltiensis Richards, Mack, and Austin, 2007; Cornufer admiraltiensis – Brown, Siler, Richards, Diesmos, and Cannatella, 2015

Species of frog

Cornufer admiraltiensis is a species of frog in the family Ceratobatrachidae. It is endemic to Papua New Guinea. It has been found on the Manus and Negros Islands in the Admiralty Archipelago. Scientists first found this frog near Tulu Village, 20 meters above sea level.

== Original description ==
- Stephen J. Richards; Andrew L. Mack; Christopher C. Austin (November 16, 2007). "Two new species of Platymantis (Anura: Ceratobatrachidae) from the Admiralty Archipelago, Papua New Guinea". Zootaxa (Abstract). 1639 (1): 41–59. doi:10.11646/zootaxa.1639.1.3.
