= Cornufer mediodiscus =

Conservation status
- Least Concern (IUCN 3.1)

Scientific classification
- Kingdom: Animalia
- Phylum: Chordata
- Class: Amphibia
- Order: Anura
- Family: Ceratobatrachidae
- Genus: Cornufer
- Species: C. mediodiscus

Binomial name
- Cornufer mediodiscus (Brown & Parker, 1970)

Synonyms
- Batrachylodes mediodiscus

Species of frog

Cornufer mediodiscus is a species of frog in the family Ceratobatrachidae. It is endemic to Papua New Guinea.

Its natural habitats are subtropical or tropical moist lowland forests, plantations, rural gardens, and heavily degraded former forest. It has been observed between 0 and 1230 meters above sea level.
