= Cornufer custos =

Conservation status
- Least Concern (IUCN 3.1)

Scientific classification
- Kingdom: Animalia
- Phylum: Chordata
- Class: Amphibia
- Order: Anura
- Family: Ceratobatrachidae
- Genus: Cornufer
- Species: C. custos

Binomial name
- Cornufer custos (Richards, Oliver, and Brown, 2014)

Synonyms
- Platymantis custos Richards, Oliver, and Brown, 2014; ornufer (Aenigmanura) custos Brown, Siler, Richards, Diesmos, and Cannatella, 2015

Species of frog

Cornufer custos is a frog in the family Ceratobatrachidae. Scientists know it exclusively from the type locality: Manus Island in Papua New Guinea.

== Original description ==
- Stephen J. Richards; P.M. Oliver; Rafe M. Brown (2014). D. Telnov (ed.). "A new scansorial species of Platymantis Günther, 1858 (Anura: Ceratobatrachidae) from Manus Island, Admiralty Archipelago, Papua New Guinea". Biodiversity, Biogeography and Nature Conservation in Wallacea and New Guinea. Entomological Society of Latvia/Pensoft: 123–134.
