= Cornufer sulcatus =

Conservation status
- Data Deficient (IUCN 3.1)

Scientific classification
- Kingdom: Animalia
- Phylum: Chordata
- Class: Amphibia
- Order: Anura
- Family: Ceratobatrachidae
- Genus: Cornufer
- Species: C. sulcatus

Binomial name
- Cornufer sulcatus (Kraus and Allison, 2007)

Synonyms
- Platymantis sulcatus Kraus and Allison, 2007; Platymantis sulcatus Frost, 2008; Cornufer (Aenigmanura) sulcatus Brown, Siler, Richards, Diesmos, and Cannatella, 2015

Species of frog

Cornufer sulcatus is a species of frog in the family Ceratobatrachidae endemic to the Nakanai Mountains on New Britain Island in Papua New Guinea.

Scientists have seen this frog burrowing in the leaf litter.
