= Cornufer gigas =

Conservation status
- Data Deficient (IUCN 3.1)

Scientific classification
- Kingdom: Animalia
- Phylum: Chordata
- Class: Amphibia
- Order: Anura
- Family: Ceratobatrachidae
- Genus: Cornufer
- Species: C. gigas

Binomial name
- Cornufer gigas (Brown & Parker, 1970)

Synonyms
- Batrachylodes gigas Brown & Parker, 1970

Species of frog

Cornufer gigas, commonly known as the Bougainville sticky-toed frog, is a species of frog in the family Ceratobatrachidae. It is endemic to Papua New Guinea. It has been observed 1300 meters above sea level. Its natural habitats are subtropical or tropical moist lowland forests and subtropical or tropical moist montane forests.
