= Cornufer macrosceles =

Conservation status
- Least Concern (IUCN 3.1)

Scientific classification
- Kingdom: Animalia
- Phylum: Chordata
- Class: Amphibia
- Order: Anura
- Family: Ceratobatrachidae
- Genus: Cornufer
- Species: C. macrosceles

Binomial name
- Cornufer macrosceles (Zweifel, 1975)

Synonyms
- Platymantis macrosceles Zweifel, 1975

Species of frog

Cornufer macrosceles is a species of frog in the family Ceratobatrachidae. It is endemic to the island of New Britain, Papua New Guinea. It is only known from the Nakanai Mountains in the central part of the island. Only three specimens are known. Common name Ti wrinkled ground frog has been coined for the species.

== Description ==
The original species description was based on a single specimen (the holotype, collected in 1956), a small adult female 30 mm (1.2 in) in snout–vent length. The holotype is a small female. Two males found in 1999 measure 29 and 32 mm (1.1 and 1.3 in) in snout–vent length. The overall appearance is slender. The head is moderately large and wider than the body. The snout is acutely pointed and elongate. The tympanum is visible, not concealed by the low, fleshy supratympanic fold. The fingers are slender and have greatly expanded and swollen terminal disks. The toe tips are moderately expanded. No webbing is present. The dorsal coloration is bright olive-green, with distinct brown patches on the dorsum. The venter is white. Skin is smooth apart from a few dermal tubercles on the head and the dorsum.

== Habitat and conservation ==
Cornufer macrosceles occurs in rainforests at about 900 m (3,000 ft) above sea level (the altitude of the type locality is unknown). Specimens have been found perched on moss-covered branches of shrub-layer vegetation, about 1 m above the ground near a small mountain stream. They were well camouflaged in this habitat.

Logging is prevalent in New Britain, but whether it is impacting the range of this species is unclear.

Cornufer macrosceles is only known from the Nakanai Mountains in central New Britain, Papua New Guinea
