= B. minutus =

B. minutus may refer to:

- Batrachylodes minutus, a frog species endemic to Papua New Guinea
- Brycinus minutus, the dwarf lake turkana robber, a fish species endemic to Kenya

== See also ==
- List of Latin and Greek words commonly used in systematic names#M
