= Cornufer browni =

Conservation status
- Least Concern (IUCN 3.1)

Scientific classification
- Kingdom: Animalia
- Phylum: Chordata
- Class: Amphibia
- Order: Anura
- Family: Ceratobatrachidae
- Genus: Cornufer
- Species: C. browni

Binomial name
- Cornufer browni (Allison & Kraus, 2001)

Synonyms
- Platymantis browni Allison & Kraus, 2001

Species of frog

Cornufer browni is a species of frog in the family Ceratobatrachidae. It is endemic to Papua New Guinea. It has been observed between 100 and 200 meters above sea level and between 1100 and 1300 meters above sea level.

The adult male frog measures 23.4 mm in snout-vent length and the adult female frog 26.7 mm. This frog has large climbing disks on the toes of its front and hind feet. The skin of the dorsum is bronze or gray-brown in color with light marks. Some individuals have a lone down the middle of the back or black marks on the back. The flanks have some red color. The frog's face is dark brown or black in color with some brown-white marks. There is black color on the legs and near the vent. The ventrum is yellow-gray or gray-black in color with silver marks. The iris of the eye is bronze to gold in color.

Its natural habitats are subtropical or tropical moist lowland forests, rural gardens, and heavily degraded former forest. These frogs live in primary or secondary closed-canopy forest. The frog hides in leaf litter during the day and is most active after a rain.

It is threatened by habitat loss.
