= Cornufer neckeri =

Conservation status
- Least Concern (IUCN 3.1)

Scientific classification
- Kingdom: Animalia
- Phylum: Chordata
- Class: Amphibia
- Order: Anura
- Family: Ceratobatrachidae
- Genus: Cornufer
- Species: C. neckeri

Binomial name
- Cornufer neckeri Brown & Myers, 1949

Synonyms
- Platymantis neckeri (Brown & Myers, 1949)

Species of frog

Cornufer neckeri is a species of frog in the family Ceratobatrachidae.

It is found in Papua New Guinea and Solomon Islands. Its natural habitat is subtropical or tropical moist lowland forests. It is threatened by habitat loss.
