= Cornufer trossulus =

Conservation status
- Least Concern (IUCN 3.1)

Scientific classification
- Kingdom: Animalia
- Phylum: Chordata
- Class: Amphibia
- Order: Anura
- Family: Ceratobatrachidae
- Genus: Cornufer
- Species: C. trossulus

Binomial name
- Cornufer trossulus (Brown & Myers, 1949)

Synonyms
- Batrachylodes trossulus Brown & Myers, 1949

Species of frog

Cornufer trossulus is a species of frog in the family Ceratobatrachidae. It is found in Papua New Guinea and Solomon Islands. Its natural habitats are subtropical or tropical moist lowland forests, plantations, rural gardens, urban areas, and heavily degraded former forest. It has been observed between 0 and 1250 meters above sea level.
