= Cornufer parilis =

Conservation status
- Endangered (IUCN 3.1)

Scientific classification
- Kingdom: Animalia
- Phylum: Chordata
- Class: Amphibia
- Order: Anura
- Family: Ceratobatrachidae
- Genus: Cornufer
- Species: C. parilis

Binomial name
- Cornufer parilis (Brown and Richards, 2008)

Synonyms
- Platymantis parilis Brown and Richards, 2008; Cornufer (Aenigmanura) parilis Brown, Siler, Richards, Diesmos, and Cannatella, 2015

Species of amphibian

Cornufer parilis is a species of frog in the family Ceratobatrachidae. Scientists know it exclusively from its the type locality on Isabel Island on the Solomon Islands in Papua New Guinea.

== Original description ==
- Rafe M Brown; Stephen J. Richards (September 29, 2008). "Two new frogs of the genus Platymantis (Anura:Ceratobatrachidae) from the Isabel Island group, Solomon Islands". Zootaxa (Abstract and first page). 1888: 47–68. doi:10.5281/zenodo.184280.
