= Hyalaethea woodfordi =

Scientific classification
- Kingdom: Animalia
- Phylum: Arthropoda
- Clade: Pancrustacea
- Class: Insecta
- Order: Lepidoptera
- Superfamily: Noctuoidea
- Family: Erebidae
- Subfamily: Arctiinae
- Genus: Hyalaethea
- Species: H. woodfordi

Binomial name
- Hyalaethea woodfordi Butler, 1887

Species of moth

Hyalaethea woodfordi is a moth of the subfamily Arctiinae. It was described by Arthur Gardiner Butler in 1887. It is found in the Solomon Islands.
