= Cornufer exedrus =

Conservation status
- Least Concern (IUCN 3.1)

Scientific classification
- Kingdom: Animalia
- Phylum: Chordata
- Class: Amphibia
- Order: Anura
- Family: Ceratobatrachidae
- Genus: Cornufer
- Species: C. exedrus

Binomial name
- Cornufer exedrus Travers, Richards, Broadhead, and Brown, 2018

Synonyms
- Cornufer (Batrachylodes) exedrus Travers, Richards, Broadhead, and Brown, 2018

Species of frog

Cornufer exedrus is a species of frog in the family Ceratobatrachidae endemic to Papua New Guinea. It has been observed between 1500 and 1700 meters above sea level in the Nakanai Mountains in Papua New Guinea.

This frog is smaller than other frogs in Cornufer.
