= Cornufer bufonulus =

Conservation status
- Data Deficient (IUCN 3.1)

Scientific classification
- Kingdom: Animalia
- Phylum: Chordata
- Class: Amphibia
- Order: Anura
- Family: Ceratobatrachidae
- Genus: Cornufer
- Species: C. bufonulus

Binomial name
- Cornufer bufonulus (Kraus and Allison, 2007)

Synonyms
- Platymantis bufonulus Kraus and Allison, 2007; Cornufer bufonulus Brown, Siler, Richards, Diesmos, and Cannatella, 2015

Species of frog

Cornufer bufonulus is a species of frog in the family Ceratobatrachidae. It is endemic to the Nakanai Mountains on New Britain Island in Papua New Guinea.

This frog burrows into the leaf litter.
