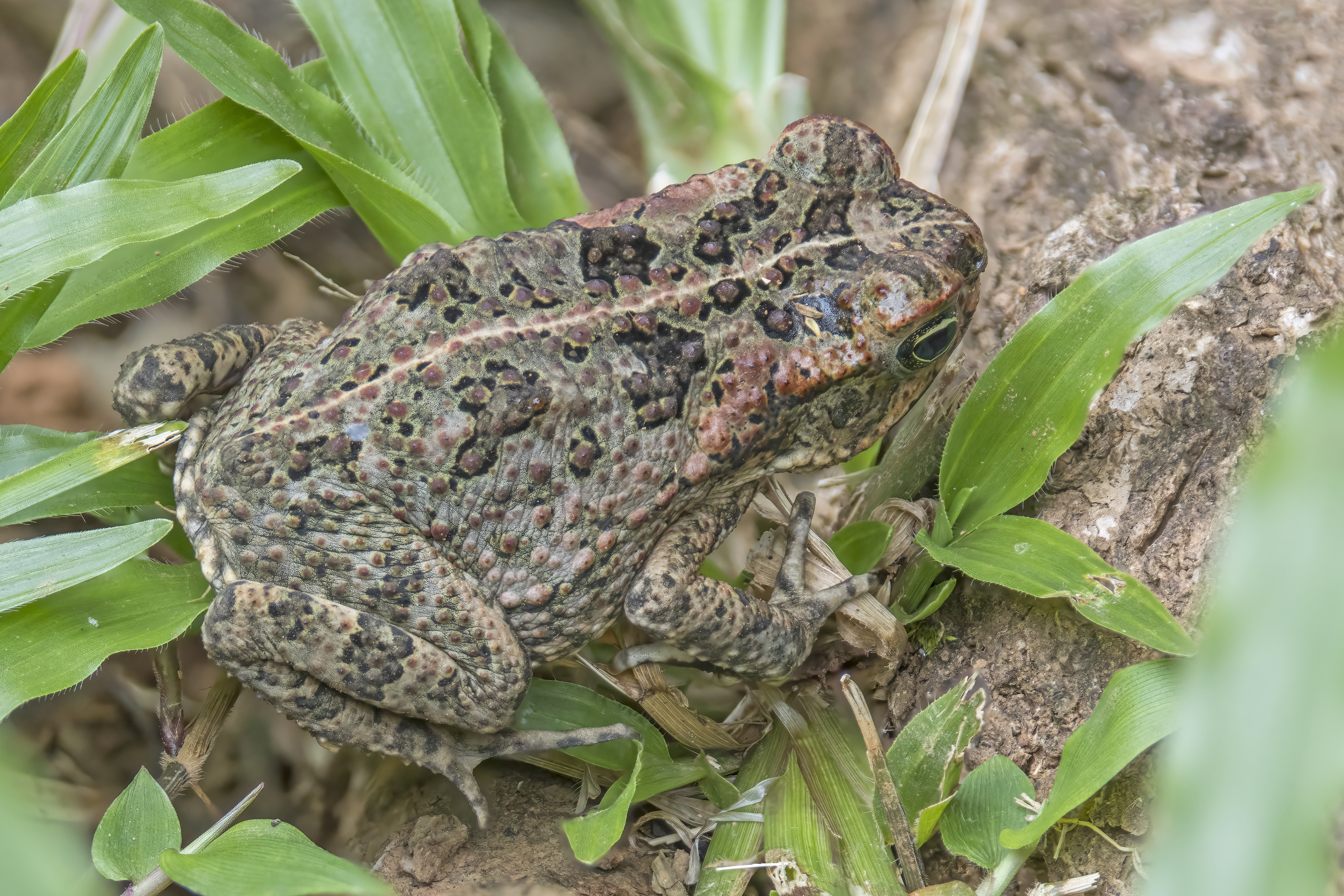
- Female on Koror
- Image and sound recording, both obtained at Koror, Palau

Conservation status
- Least Concern (IUCN 3.1)

Scientific classification
- Kingdom: Animalia
- Phylum: Chordata
- Class: Amphibia
- Order: Anura
- Family: Ceratobatrachidae
- Genus: Cornufer
- Species: C. pelewensis

Binomial name
- Cornufer pelewensis (Peters, 1867)

Synonyms
- Platymantis pelewensis Peters, 1867

= Cornufer pelewensis =

Species of amphibian

Cornufer pelewensis, commonly known as Palau frog or Palau wrinkled ground frog, is a species of frog in the family Ceratobatrachidae. It is endemic to Palau.

The adult female frog measures more than 60 mm in snout-vent length and the adult male frog 30–35 mm. The skin of the dorsum can be tan, brown, or yellow. Some individuals have patterned marks. Sometimes there is pink or purple color near the groin.

These frogs live in many parts of Palau, all of the larger islands and many of the smaller ones, but none in the southwest. Scientists have observed that the frogs do not live on some islands that have suitable habitats.

Its natural habitats are subtropical or tropical dry forests, subtropical or tropical moist lowland forests, subtropical or tropical mangrove forests, dry savanna, moist savanna, subtropical or tropical dry shrubland, subtropical or tropical moist shrubland, rocky areas, caves, plantations, rural gardens, urban areas, heavily degraded former forest, and man-made karsts. These frogs can tolerate habitats that have been disturbed by humans, not only forests but also back yards and farms.

These frogs undergo direct development, hatching as froglets rather than tadpoles. Scientists know little about their mating habits but speculate that, because of the large size disparity between male and female frogs, they do not undergo amplexus.
