= Cornufer desticans =

Conservation status
- Vulnerable (IUCN 3.1)

Scientific classification
- Kingdom: Animalia
- Phylum: Chordata
- Class: Amphibia
- Order: Anura
- Family: Ceratobatrachidae
- Genus: Cornufer
- Species: C. desticans

Binomial name
- Cornufer desticans (Brown and Richards, 2008)

Synonyms
- Platymantis desticans Brown and Richards, 2008; Cornufer desticans Brown, Siler, Richards, Diesmos, and Cannatella, 2015

Species of frog

Cornufer desticans is an arboreal frog in the family Ceratobatrachidae. Scientists have seen it in two places: Barora Island and Choiseul Island, both in the Solomon Islands. Spottings occurred between 0 and 10 meters above sea level.
