= Treasury Island frog =

Treasury Island frog may refer to:

- Treasury Island tree frog (Litoria thesaurensis), a frog in the family Hylidae found in Indonesia, Papua New Guinea, and Solomon Islands
- Treasury Island webbed frog (Discodeles bufoniformis), a frog in the family Ceratobatrachidae endemic to the Solomon Islands archipelago
