= Cornufer mimicus =

Conservation status
- Data Deficient (IUCN 3.1)

Scientific classification
- Kingdom: Animalia
- Phylum: Chordata
- Class: Amphibia
- Order: Anura
- Family: Ceratobatrachidae
- Genus: Cornufer
- Species: C. mimicus

Binomial name
- Cornufer mimicus (Brown & Tyler, 1968)

Synonyms
- Platymantis mimicus Brown & Tyler, 1968; Cornufer mimica Brown & Tyler, 1968

Species of frog

Cornufer mimicus is a species of frog in the family Ceratobatrachidae. It is endemic to Papua New Guinea.

Its natural habitats are subtropical or tropical moist lowland forests and plantations .
