= Cornufer aculeodactylus =

Conservation status
- Least Concern (IUCN 3.1)

Scientific classification
- Kingdom: Animalia
- Phylum: Chordata
- Class: Amphibia
- Order: Anura
- Family: Ceratobatrachidae
- Genus: Cornufer
- Species: C. aculeodactylus

Binomial name
- Cornufer aculeodactylus Brown, 1952

Synonyms
- Platymantis aculeodactyla

Species of frog

Cornufer aculeodactylus is a species of frog in the family Ceratobatrachidae. It is found in Papua New Guinea and Solomon Islands. Its natural habitats are subtropical or tropical moist lowland forests and heavily degraded former forest. It is threatened by habitat loss.
