= Cornufer cryptotis =

Conservation status
- Least Concern (IUCN 3.1)

Scientific classification
- Kingdom: Animalia
- Phylum: Chordata
- Class: Amphibia
- Order: Anura
- Family: Ceratobatrachidae
- Genus: Cornufer
- Species: C. cryptotis

Binomial name
- Cornufer cryptotis (Günther, 1999)

Synonyms
- Platymantis cryptotis Günther, 1999

Species of frog

Cornufer cryptotis is a species of frog in the family Ceratobatrachidae. It is endemic to West Papua, Indonesia.

Scientists first found it no more than 50 m from the Utowa River, 150 meters above sea level. Its natural habitats are subtropical or tropical moist lowland forests, rural gardens, and heavily degraded former forest.
