= Cornufer akarithymus =

Conservation status
- Least Concern (IUCN 3.1)

Scientific classification
- Kingdom: Animalia
- Phylum: Chordata
- Class: Amphibia
- Order: Anura
- Family: Ceratobatrachidae
- Genus: Cornufer
- Species: C. akarithyma

Binomial name
- Cornufer akarithyma Brown & Tyler, 1968

Synonyms
- Platymantis akarithyma

Species of frog

Cornufer akarithymus is a species of frog in the family Ceratobatrachidae. It is endemic to Papua New Guinea, on New Britain Island. It has been observed in three mountain ranges: Whiteman, Nakanai, and Baining.

Its natural habitat is subtropical or tropical moist lowland forests. It is threatened by habitat loss.
