= Cornufer nakanaiorum =

Conservation status
- Least Concern (IUCN 3.1)

Scientific classification
- Kingdom: Animalia
- Phylum: Chordata
- Class: Amphibia
- Order: Anura
- Family: Ceratobatrachidae
- Genus: Cornufer
- Species: C. nakanaiorum

Binomial name
- Cornufer nakanaiorum (Brown, Foufopoulos, and Richards, 2006)

Synonyms
- Platymantis nakanaiorum Brown, Foufopoulos, and Richards, 2006; Cornufer (Aenigmanura) nakanaiorum Brown, Siler, Richards, Diesmos, and Cannatella, 2015

Species of frog

Cornufer nakanaiorum is a species of frog in the family Ceratobatrachidae endemic to montane rainforests in the Nakanai Mountains on New Britain Island, Papua New Guinea.

The adult frog measures 34.2 to 35.8 mm in snout-vent length.
