= Cornufer vogti =

Conservation status
- Least Concern (IUCN 3.1)

Scientific classification
- Kingdom: Animalia
- Phylum: Chordata
- Class: Amphibia
- Order: Anura
- Family: Ceratobatrachidae
- Genus: Cornufer
- Subgenus: Cornufer (Potamorana)
- Species: C. vogti

Binomial name
- Cornufer vogti (Hediger, 1934)

Synonyms
- Rana ventricosus Vogt, 1912 – junior primary homonym of Rana ventricosa Linnaeus, 1758; Discodeles ventricosus (Vogt, 1912); Rana vogti Hediger, 1934 – replacement name for Rana ventricosus Vogt, 1912; Discodeles vogti (Vogt, 1912); Rana bufoniformis cognata Hediger, 1933

Species of amphibian

Cornufer vogti (common name: Admiralty Island webbed frog) is a species of frogs in the family Ceratobatrachidae. It is endemic to the Admiralty Islands, Papua New Guinea, where it is known from the Rambutyo Island, its type locality, and from the Manus Island. The specific name vogti honours Theodor Vogt (1881–1932), a German naturalist. Vogt described this species in 1912; however, the name he used, Rana ventricosus, was already used. Thus a replacement name Rana vogti was created by Heini Hediger in 1934.

== Description ==
The species was described based on a single adult female,. the holotype, measuring 158 mm (6.2 in) in snout–vent length. The overall appearance is robust. The head is broad and the snout is blunt. The eyes are moderately large. The tympanum is visible. The toes are almost fully webbed. Skin is granulate. The body is very dark, almost black above. The underside is marbled white.

== Habitat and conservation ==
Discodeles vogti inhabit streams in tropical lowland rain forests, but they can also been found in suburban areas, rural gardens, and other degraded habitats, albeit at lower densities than in mature forests. The species breeds by direct development and lays its eggs on the ground. It is relatively common, but threatened by habitat loss caused by logging. It is also consumed for food.
