= Cornufer mamusiorum =

Conservation status
- Least Concern (IUCN 3.1)

Scientific classification
- Kingdom: Animalia
- Phylum: Chordata
- Class: Amphibia
- Order: Anura
- Family: Ceratobatrachidae
- Genus: Cornufer
- Subgenus: Cornufer (Aenigmanura)
- Species: C. mamusiorum

Binomial name
- Cornufer mamusiorum (Foufopoulos and Brown, 2004)

Synonyms
- Platymantis mamusiorum Foufopoulos and Brown, 2004

Species of frog

Cornufer mamusiorum is a species of frog in the family Ceratobatrachidae. It is endemic to the central Nakanai Mountains in New Britain, Papua New Guinea. The specific name mamusiorum refers to the Mamusi, a local tribe.

== Description ==
Adult males measure 27–31 mm (1.1–1.2 in) in snout–vent length; females are unknown. The snout is barely protruding beyond the lower jaw, with its extreme tip bluntly pointed in dorsal view, rounding to vertical in lateral view. The tympanum is visible, not concealed by the slight supra-tympanic fold. The fingers have greatly expanded terminal discs. The toes have moderately expanded terminal discs and very rudimentary webbing. Skin is smooth. The upper parts of the body are yellowish-green, becoming more greenish anteriorly, and have fine dark brown reticulation intermixed with melanic blotches; some specimens have yellow spots. The ventrum is light yellowish-green, fading to pinkish-brown in the groin. The iris十dirty mustard yellow above and darker yellowish-brown below.

Cornufer mamusiorum is only known from the central Nakanai Mountains in New Britain, Papua New Guinea

== Habitat and conservation ==
Cornufer mamusiorum is known from primary rainforest at about 1,500 m (4,900 ft) above sea level characterized by epiphyte-covered Nothofagus stands with a relatively open canopy; tree fall gaps are covered by dense climbing bamboo thickets. The forest floor is covered by a thick, moss-covered layer of leaf litter and decaying branches. The species is presumed to occur more widely in high elevation forests above approx. 1,200 m (3,900 ft) in the Nakanai Range, possibly even wider. Although common in its native habitat, it is considered vulnerable due to its very limited distribution. Main threats include habitat loss because of logging, as well as invasive species and diseases.
