= Cornufer weberi =

Conservation status
- Least Concern (IUCN 3.1)

Scientific classification
- Kingdom: Animalia
- Phylum: Chordata
- Class: Amphibia
- Order: Anura
- Family: Ceratobatrachidae
- Genus: Cornufer
- Species: C. weberi

Binomial name
- Cornufer weberi (Schmidt, 1932)

Synonyms
- Platymantis weberi Schmidt, 1932; Platymantis papuensis weberi; Cornufer papuensis weberi; Cornufer (Aenigmanura) weberi

Species of frog

Cornufer weberi, Weber's wrinkled ground frog, is a species of frog in the family Ceratobatrachidae. It is found in Papua New Guinea and Solomon Islands. Its natural habitats are subtropical or tropical moist lowland forests, plantations, rural gardens, urban areas, and heavily degraded former forest.

== Original description ==
- Brown (2015). "Replacement for Platymantis solomonensis". Zool. J. Linn. Soc. 174: 130–168. doi:10.1111/zoj.12232.
