= Cornufer boulengeri =

Conservation status
- Least Concern (IUCN 3.1)

Scientific classification
- Kingdom: Animalia
- Phylum: Chordata
- Class: Amphibia
- Order: Anura
- Family: Ceratobatrachidae
- Genus: Cornufer
- Species: C. boulengeri

Binomial name
- Cornufer boulengeri (Boettger, 1892)

Synonyms
- Platymantis rhipiphalcus Brown and Tyler, 1968; Platymantis boulengeri (Boettger, 1892)

Species of amphibian

Cornufer boulengeri, commonly known as Boulenger's wrinkled ground frog or Boulenger's platymantis, is a species of frog in the family Ceratobatrachidae. It is endemic to New Britain Island in the Bismarck Archipelago, Papua New Guinea. It has been observed as high as 1500 meters above sea level. The adults live on the forest floor of lowland and foothill rain forests, whereas juveniles occur low on the vegetation. It is potentially threatened by habitat loss caused by logging.
