= Hyalaethea =

Scientific classification
- Domain: Eukaryota
- Kingdom: Animalia
- Phylum: Arthropoda
- Class: Insecta
- Order: Lepidoptera
- Superfamily: Noctuoidea
- Family: Erebidae
- Subfamily: Arctiinae
- Genus: Hyalaethea; Butler, 1887

Genus of moths

Hyalaethea is a genus of moths in the subfamily Arctiinae. The genus was erected by Arthur Gardiner Butler in 1887.

== Species ==
- Hyalaethea alberti Rothschild, 1910
- Hyalaethea attemae De Vos, 2010
- Hyalaethea bivitreata Hampson, 1909
- Hyalaethea decipiens Rothschild, 1910
- Hyalaethea dohertyi Rothschild, 1910
- Hyalaethea malaitaensis Obraztsov, 1953
- Hyalaethea meeki Rothschild, 1910
- Hyalaethea solomonis Hampson
- Hyalaethea metaphaea Druce, 1898
- Hyalaethea obraztsovi De Vos, 2010
- Hyalaethea sublutea Bethune-Baker, 1908
- Hyalaethea woodfordi Butler, 1887
