= Ancylodactylus barbouri =

Conservation status
- Least Concern (IUCN 3.1)

Scientific classification
- Kingdom: Animalia
- Phylum: Chordata
- Class: Reptilia
- Order: Squamata
- Suborder: Gekkota
- Family: Gekkonidae
- Genus: Ancylodactylus
- Species: A. barbouri

Binomial name
- Ancylodactylus barbouri Perret, 1986

Species of lizard

Ancylodactylus barbouri, also known commonly as Barbour's gecko, is a species of lizard in the family Gekkonidae. The species is endemic to Tanzania.

== Etymology ==
The specific name, barbouri, is in honor of American herpetologist Thomas Barbour.

== Geographic range ==
A. barbouri is found in the Uluguru Mountains of Tanzania.

== Reproduction ==
A. barbouri is oviparous.
