= Hyalaethea attemae =

Scientific classification
- Kingdom: Animalia
- Phylum: Arthropoda
- Clade: Pancrustacea
- Class: Insecta
- Order: Lepidoptera
- Superfamily: Noctuoidea
- Family: Erebidae
- Subfamily: Arctiinae
- Genus: Hyalaethea
- Species: H. attemae

Binomial name
- Hyalaethea attemae De Vos, 2010

Species of moth

Hyalaethea attemae is a moth of the subfamily Arctiinae first described by Rob de Vos in 2010. It is found on Western New Guinea in Indonesia.
