= Hyalaethea obraztsovi =

Scientific classification
- Kingdom: Animalia
- Phylum: Arthropoda
- Clade: Pancrustacea
- Class: Insecta
- Order: Lepidoptera
- Superfamily: Noctuoidea
- Family: Erebidae
- Subfamily: Arctiinae
- Genus: Hyalaethea
- Species: H. obraztsovi

Binomial name
- Hyalaethea obraztsovi De Vos, 2010

Species of moth

Hyalaethea obraztsovi is a moth of the subfamily Arctiinae first described by Rob de Vos in 2010. It is found on New Guinea.
