= Cornufer minutus =

Conservation status
- Vulnerable (IUCN 3.1)

Scientific classification
- Kingdom: Animalia
- Phylum: Chordata
- Class: Amphibia
- Order: Anura
- Family: Ceratobatrachidae
- Genus: Cornufer
- Species: C. minutus

Binomial name
- Cornufer minutus (Brown & Parker, 1970)

Synonyms
- Batrachylodes minutus Brown & Parker, 1970

Species of frog

Cornufer minutus is a species of frog in the family Ceratobatrachidae. It is endemic to Papua New Guinea.

Its natural habitats are subtropical or tropical moist lowland forests, plantations, rural gardens, urban areas, and heavily degraded former forest. It has been observed between 300 and 900 meters above sea level.
