= Hyalaethea bivitreata =

Scientific classification
- Kingdom: Animalia
- Phylum: Arthropoda
- Clade: Pancrustacea
- Class: Insecta
- Order: Lepidoptera
- Superfamily: Noctuoidea
- Family: Erebidae
- Subfamily: Arctiinae
- Genus: Hyalaethea
- Species: H. bivitreata

Binomial name
- Hyalaethea bivitreata Hampson, 1909

Species of moth

Hyalaethea bivitreata is a moth of the subfamily Arctiinae. It was described by George Hampson in 1909. It is found on the Tanimbar Islands of Indonesia.
