= Richard Sternfeld =

German herpetologist

Richard Sternfeld (8 February 1884, in Bielefeld – 1943 in Auschwitz) was a German herpetologist, who was responsible for describing over forty species of amphibians and reptiles, particularly from Germany's African and Pacific colonies (i.e. modern-day Tanzania, Cameroon, Togo, Namibia and Papua New Guinea). Sternfeld was Jewish and died at Auschwitz.

== Education ==
Sternfeld was the son of a merchant in Bielefeld, North Rhine-Westphalia. He was educated in a local gymnasium and initially entered university in 1903 to study medicine at Freiburg, but he switched to studying natural science at Bonn. In 1907 he returned to Freiburg, to obtain his Dr. Phil., with a dissertation on the biology of mayflies under the guidance of evolutionary biologist August Weismann.

== Museum employment and First World War ==
Sternfeld's first appointment was alongside herpetologist Gustav Tornier at the Zoological Museum at the University of Berlin. He worked on the herpetofaunas of the German colonies in Africa and the Southwest Pacific, producing 26 titles in 6.5 years. In 1913 he moved to the Senckenberg Museum at Frankfurt to replace herpetologist Philipp Lehrs, and widened his geographical area of interest to include Central Africa, Japan, Australia, the Pacific Islands, and South America.

During World War I he was called up for service, serving his country in Macedonia. After the war, Sternfeld clashed with the Director of the Senckenberg and was fired at the end of 1920 after he attempted to unionize museum staff. His replacement was Robert Mertens.

== Post-museum employment ==
Sternfeld was unable to conduct research following his departure from the Senckenberg Museum. From 1923 onwards, he worked as a horse race reporter for the German horse racing newspaper Sportwelt. He developed into a leading and accepted expert in thoroughbred breeding in Germany. In March 1937, Sternfeld lost this job because of his Jewish descent. Since March 1941 he was forced to perform hard labour in Berlin, and on 1 March 1943 he was deported by the Nazis to Auschwitz, where he was murdered later that year.

== Contributions to herpetology ==
Between the years 1908-1925, Sternfeld described 42 species of snakes and lizards and five species of frogs that are still recognized today, although only seven of the reptiles retain their original names. The species list below begins with the currently accepted name, followed by Sternfeld's original name (some were placed in subgenera indicated by parentheses(). Subspecies are indicated by trinomial names, and one variety is indicated by "var".

1908

- Dipsadoboa brevirostris as Dipsadomorphus brevirostris (West African short-snouted treesnake)
- Lamprophis erlangeri as Boodon erlangeri (Erlanger's house snake)
- Micrelaps bicoloratus (Kenyan two-headed snake)
- Namibiana labialis as Glauconia labialis (Damara threadsnake)
- Namibiana latifrons as Glauconia latifrons (Benguela threadsnake)
- Typhlops zenkeri (Zenker's wormsnake)

1910

- Letheobia gracilis as Typhlops gracilis (gracile blindsnake)
- Madatyphlops platyrhynchus as Typhlops platyrhynchus (Tanga wormsnake)
- Scelotes schebeni (Scheben's legless skink)

1911

- Lygodactylus grotei (red-tailed dwarf gecko)
- Pedioplanis breviceps as Eremias breviceps (short-headed sandveld lizard)
- Trachylepis boulengeri as Mabuya diesneri boulengeri (Boulenger's sun skink)

1912

- Cnemaspis quattuorseriata as Gonatodes quattuorseriatus (Sternfeld's day gecko)
- Cynisca schaeferi as Chirindia schaeferi (Cameroon worm-lizard)
- Dasypeltis atra as Dasypeltis scabra var. atra (montane egg-eating snake)
- Geocalamus acutus (Wedge-snouted worm-lizard)
- Kinyongia adolfifriderici as Chamaeleon adolfi-friderici (Ituri chameleon)
- Leptosiaphos graueri as Lygosoma graueri quinquedigitata (Rwanda five-toed skink)
- Leptotyphlops latirostris as Glauconia latirostris (Uvira threadsnake)
- Letheobia graueri as Typhlops graueri (Sternfeld's blindsnake)
- Lygodactylus scheffleri (Scheffler's dwarf gecko)
- Trioceros schubotzi as Chamaeleon schubotzi (Mt. Kenya montane dwarf chameleon)

1913

- Gerrhopilus depressiceps as Typhlops depressiceps (lowland beaked blindsnake)
- Toxicocalamus buergersi as Ultrocalamus bürgersi (Torricelli forest snake)
- Toxicocalamus preussi as Ultrocalamus preussi (Preuss’ forest snake)

1917

- Kassina maculosa as Megalixalus maculosus (marbled running frog)
- Ptychadena tellinii as Rana schubotzi (Tellini's grass frog)

1918

- Cryptoblepharus africanus as Ablepharus boutonii africanus (East African snake-eyed skink)
- Cryptoblepharus aldabrae as Ablepharus boutonii aldabrae (Aldabran snake-eyed skink)
- Cryptoblepharus australis as Ablepharus boutonii australis (Inland snake-eyed skink)
- Cryptoblepharus caudatus as Ablepharus boutonii caudatus (Juan de Nova Island snake-eyed skink)
- Cryptoblepharus pulcher as Ablepharus boutonii pulcher (elegant snake-eyed skink)
- Cryptoblepharus voeltzkowi as Ablepharus boutonii voeltzkowi (Voeltzkow's snake-eyed skink)
- Emoia boettgeri as Lygosoma (Emoia) boettgeri (Boettger's emo skink)

1919

- Ctenotus leonardii as Lygosoma (Hinulia) leonhardii (Leonhard's ctenotus)
- Ctenotus quattuordecimlineatus as Lygosoma (Hinulia) quattuordecimlineatum (fourteen-lined ctenotus)
- Eremiascincus intermedius as Lygosoma (Hinulia) fasciolatus intermedium (northern narrow-banded skink)
- Lerista desertorum as Lygosoma (Rhodona) planiventale desertorum (central deserts robust slider)
- Liopholis striata as Egernia striata (nocturnal desert skink)
- Pogona minor as Amphibolurus barbatus minor (dwarf bearded dragon)
- Simoselaps anomalus as Rhynchelaps anomalus (northern desert banded snake)
- Tiliqua multifasciata as Tiliqua occipitalis multifasciata (Centralian blue-tongued skink)

1920

- Batrachylodes vertebralis as Chaperina friedicii (striped Solomons frog)
- Batrachylodes wolfi as Sphenophryne wolfi (Wolf's Solomons frog)
- Bothrops medusa as Lachesis medusa (Venezuela forest pitviper)
- Palmatorappia solomonis as Hylella solomonis (Solomons palm frog)

1925

- Tympanocryptis centralis (Central Australian earless dragon)

Only two species described in honour of Richard Sternfeld, are recognised today:

- Phrynobatrachus sternfeldi (Ahl, 1924) (Sternfeld's river frog)
- Trioceros sternfeldi (Rand, 1963) (Tanzanian montane dwarf chameleon)

== Published works ==
In 1912 he published his best known work, a book on Central European herpetofauna titled "Die Reptilien und Amphibien mitteleuropas". Sternfeld include wrote approximately 35 herpetological papers, some quite extensive, during his museum career and immediately afterwards, including:

- Die Schlangenfauna Togos, 1908 – Snakes native to Togoland.
- Die Schlangen Deutsch-Ostafrikas, 1910 – Snakes native to German East Africa.
- Zur Herpetologie Südostafrikas, 1911 – Herpetology of southeastern Africa.
- Zur Tiergeographie Papuasiens und der pazifischen Inselwelt, 1920 – Zoogeography involving Papua New Guinea and islands of the Pacific.
- Beiträge zur Herpetologie Inner-Australiens, 1925 – Contribution to the herpetology of Australia's interior.
