= Ancylodactylus petrodroma =

Conservation status
- Data Deficient (IUCN 3.1)

Scientific classification
- Kingdom: Animalia
- Phylum: Chordata
- Class: Reptilia
- Order: Squamata
- Suborder: Gekkota
- Family: Gekkonidae
- Genus: Ancylodactylus
- Species: A. petrodroma

Binomial name
- Ancylodactylus petrodroma Perret, 1986

Species of lizard

Ancylodactylus petrodroma, also known as the Nigeria crag gecko or Ondo forest gecko, is a species of gecko endemic to Nigeria.
