= Two-scaled gecko =

Conservation status
- Near Threatened (IUCN 3.1)

Scientific classification
- Kingdom: Animalia
- Phylum: Chordata
- Class: Reptilia
- Order: Squamata
- Suborder: Gekkota
- Family: Gekkonidae
- Genus: Ancylodactylus
- Species: A. dilepis

Binomial name
- Ancylodactylus dilepis Perret, 1963

Synonyms
- Cnemaspis quattuorseriatus dilepis

Species of lizard

The two-scaled gecko (Ancylodactylus dilepis) is a species of gecko endemic to South-Eastern Cameroon.
