= Mount Elgon forest gecko =

Conservation status
- Vulnerable (IUCN 3.1)

Scientific classification
- Kingdom: Animalia
- Phylum: Chordata
- Class: Reptilia
- Order: Squamata
- Suborder: Gekkota
- Family: Gekkonidae
- Genus: Ancylodactylus
- Species: A. elgonensis

Binomial name
- Ancylodactylus elgonensis Loveridge, 1936

Species of lizard

The Mount Elgon forest gecko (Ancylodactylus elgonensis) is a species of gecko endemic to Kenya and Uganda.
