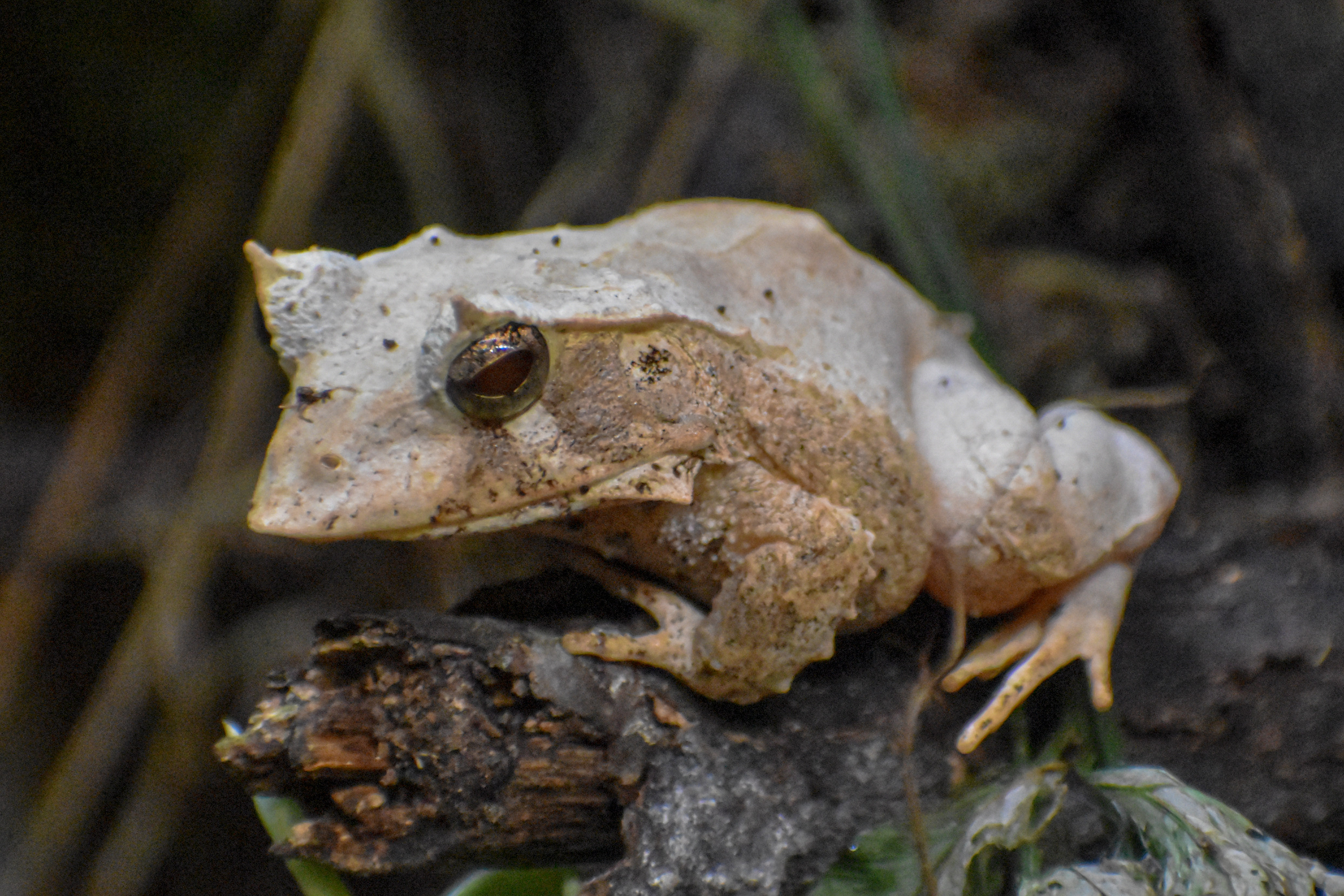

Conservation status
- Least Concern (IUCN 3.1)

Scientific classification
- Kingdom: Animalia
- Phylum: Chordata
- Class: Amphibia
- Order: Anura
- Family: Ceratobatrachidae
- Genus: Cornufer
- Species: C. guentheri

Binomial name
- Cornufer guentheri (Boulenger, 1884)

Synonyms
- Ceratobatrachus guentheri Boulenger, 1884

= Cornufer guentheri =

Species of amphibian

Cornufer guentheri, commonly known as the Solomon Island leaf frog, Solomon Island eyelash frog and Gunther's triangle frog, is a species of frog in the family Ceratobatrachidae. This frog can be found throughout the Solomon Islands archipelago (both in the Autonomous Region of Bougainville of Papua New Guinea and in the Solomon Islands, an independent state), except for San Cristobal. Scientists have seen it between 0 and 830 meters above sea level.

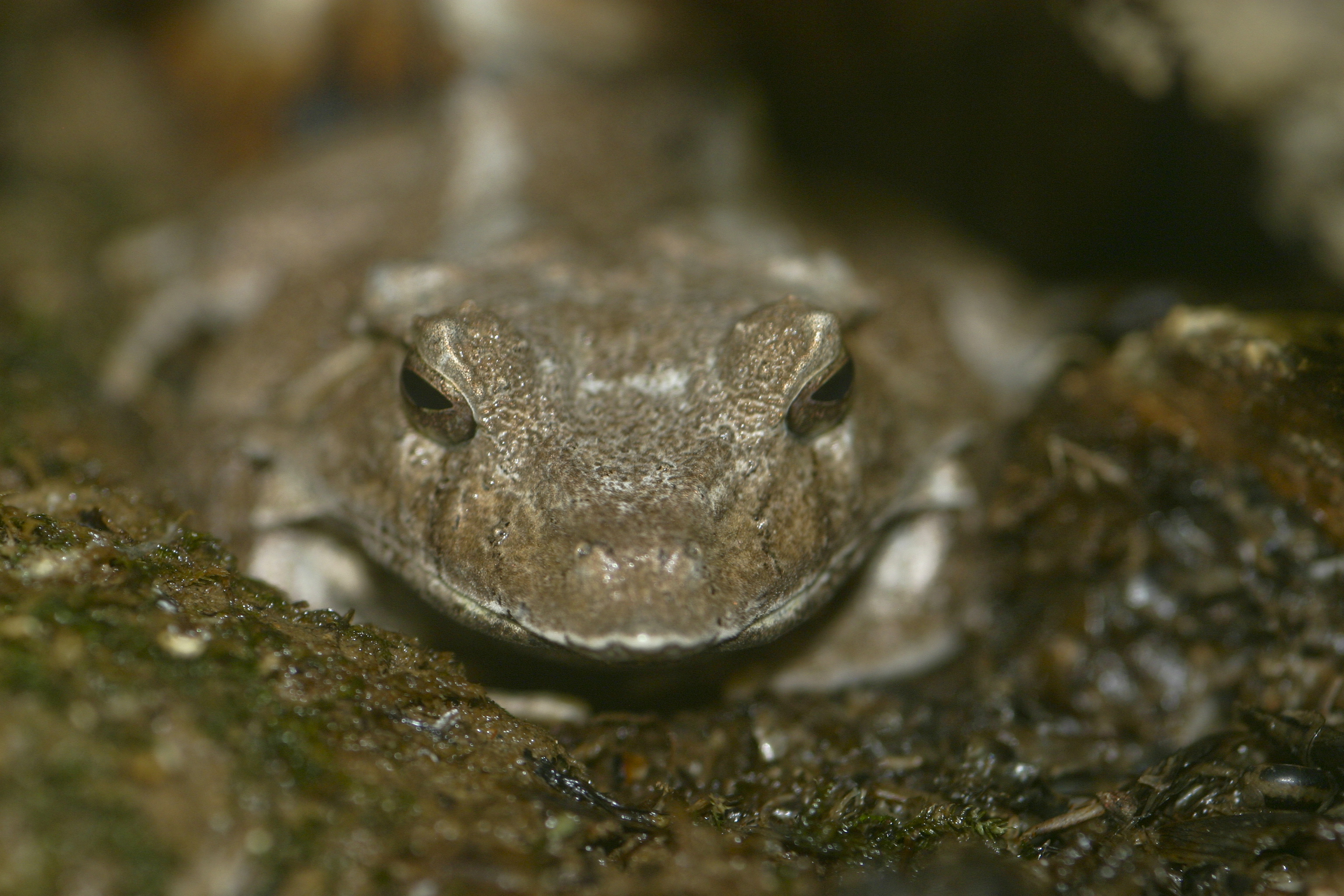
Cornufer guentheri

Cornufer guentheri is abundant throughout the Solomon Islands where it can be found on the forest floor in tropical rain forests; it can also live in secondary forests, rural gardens, and in other modified habitats. They average about 7.6–10 cm (3–4 in) in length, with females being larger than the males. Their cryptic coloration and dorsal patterns aid in their camouflage—often mimicking decaying leaf matter—giving rise to the common name of "leaf frog". They are an interesting example of a species that undergoes direct development—there is no free-living tadpole stage; instead, the juvenile emerges from the egg as a fully developed froglet. Eggs are laid in small hollows at the base of trees. They grow rapidly from a 3 mm (1/8 in) long froglet on a diet of tiny insects until they can take the adult diet of insects, arthropods, smaller amphibians and small reptiles. They are ambush predators, pouncing quickly on any prey animals that happen to wander within their reach – including their own species.
