= Sternfeld's gecko =

Scientific classification
- Kingdom: Animalia
- Phylum: Chordata
- Class: Reptilia
- Order: Squamata
- Suborder: Gekkota
- Family: Gekkonidae
- Genus: Ancylodactylus
- Species: A. quattuorseriatus

Binomial name
- Ancylodactylus quattuorseriatus (Sternfeld, 1912)

Synonyms
- Gonatodes quattuorseriatus

Species of lizard

Sternfeld's gecko (Ancylodactylus quattuorseriatus) is a species of geckos found in central Africa.
