= Koehler's gecko =

Conservation status
- Least Concern (IUCN 3.1)

Scientific classification
- Kingdom: Animalia
- Phylum: Chordata
- Class: Reptilia
- Order: Squamata
- Suborder: Gekkota
- Family: Gekkonidae
- Genus: Ancylodactylus
- Species: A. koehleri

Binomial name
- Ancylodactylus koehleri Mertens, 1937
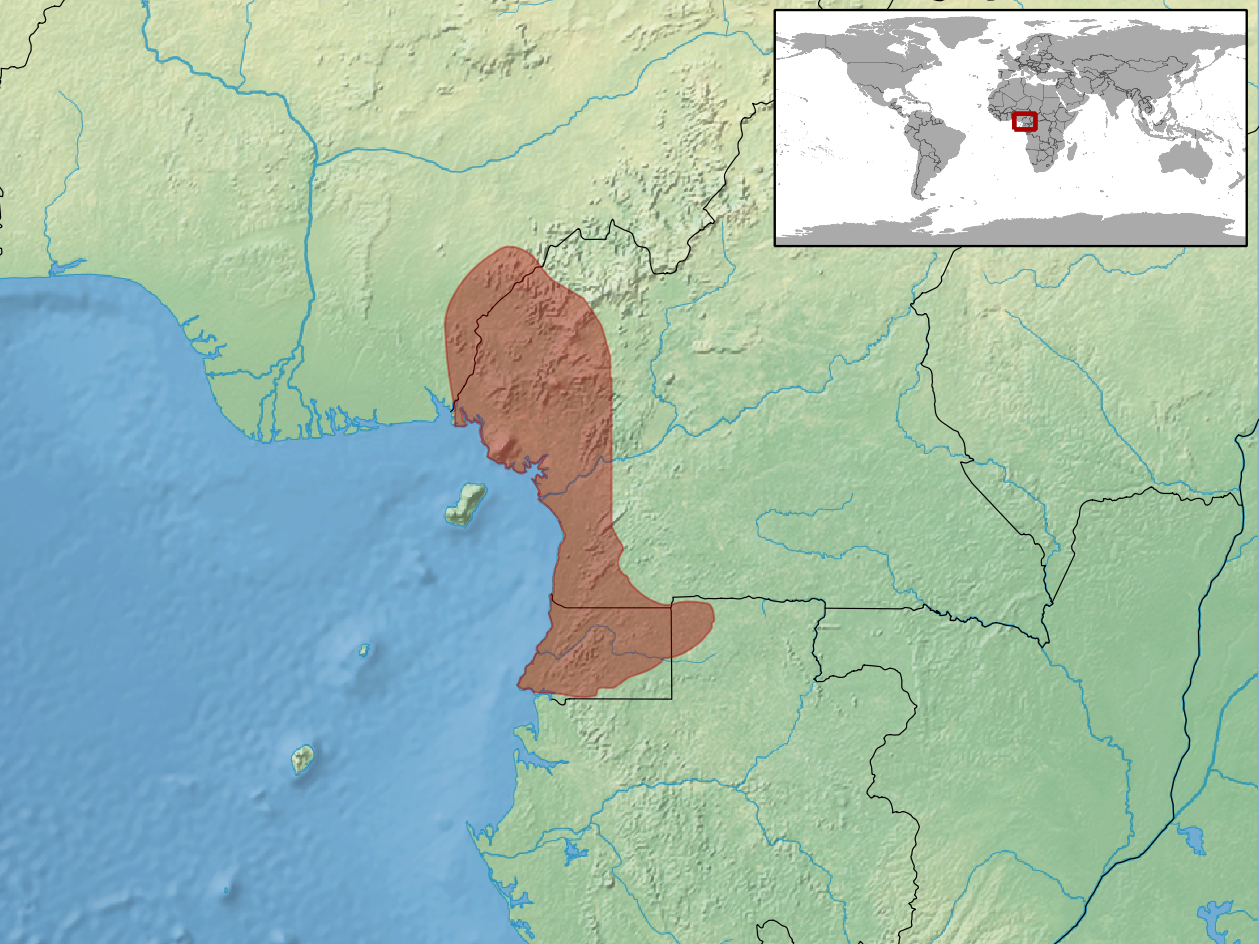

Synonyms
- Cnemaspis köhleri Mertens, 1937; Cnemaspis africanus köhleri — Loveridge, 1947; Cnemaspis koehleri — Perret, 1986; Ancylodactylus koehleri — Malonza & Bauer, 2022

Species of lizard

Koehler's gecko (Ancylodactylus koehleri) is a species of gecko, a lizard in the family Gekkonidae. The species is native to Central Africa.

== Etymology ==
The specific name, koehleri, is in honor of Max Köhler who collected the holotype.

== Geographic range ==
A. koehleri is found in Cameroon and Equatorial Guinea, and also in Gabon and Nigeria.

== Habitat ==
The preferred natural habitat of A. koehleri is forest, at altitudes of 560–1,500 m (1,840–4,920 ft).

== Reproduction ==
A. koehleri is oviparous.
