= Hyalaethea dohertyi =

Scientific classification
- Kingdom: Animalia
- Phylum: Arthropoda
- Clade: Pancrustacea
- Class: Insecta
- Order: Lepidoptera
- Superfamily: Noctuoidea
- Family: Erebidae
- Subfamily: Arctiinae
- Genus: Hyalaethea
- Species: H. dohertyi

Binomial name
- Hyalaethea dohertyi Rothschild, 1910

Species of moth

Hyalaethea dohertyi is a moth of the subfamily Arctiinae. It was described by Rothschild in 1910. It is found in Papua New Guinea.
