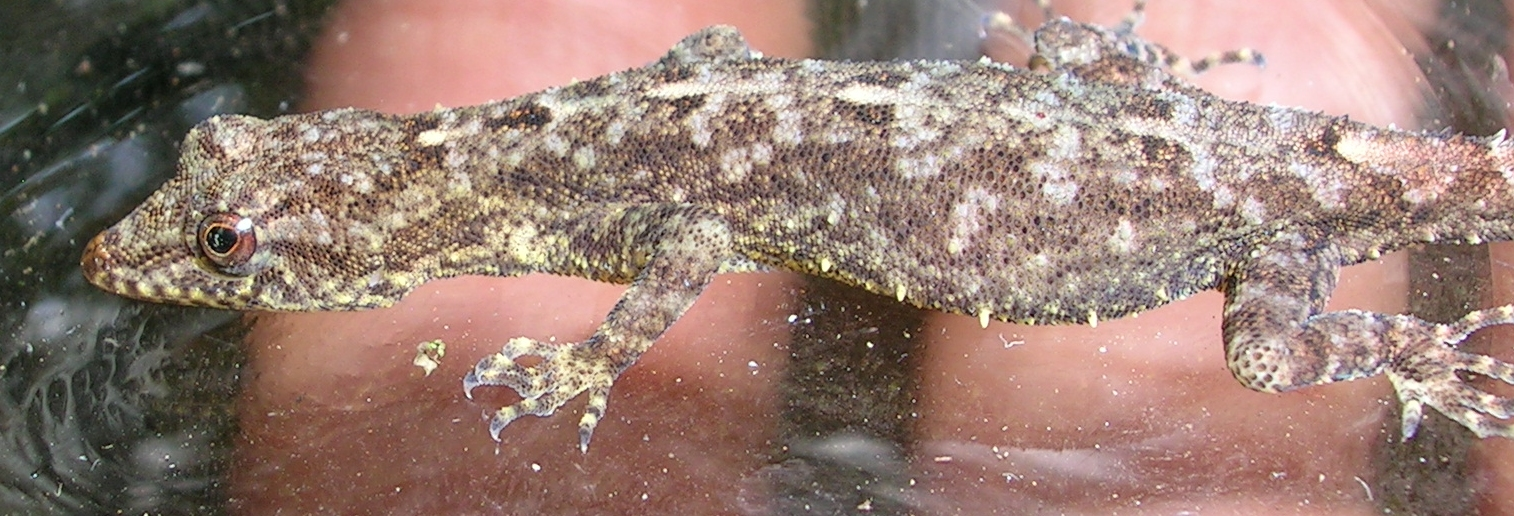

Conservation status
- Data Deficient (IUCN 3.1)

Scientific classification
- Kingdom: Animalia
- Phylum: Chordata
- Class: Reptilia
- Order: Squamata
- Suborder: Gekkota
- Family: Gekkonidae
- Genus: Ancylodactylus
- Species: A. gigas

Binomial name
- Ancylodactylus gigas Perret, 1986

= Ancylodactylus gigas =

Giant Forest Gecko

Species of lizard

Ancylodactylus gigas, also known as Perret's Nigeria gecko or giant forest gecko, is a species of gecko endemic to Nigeria.
