= Ancylodactylus laikipiensis =

Conservation status
- Vulnerable (IUCN 3.1)

Scientific classification
- Kingdom: Animalia
- Phylum: Chordata
- Class: Reptilia
- Order: Squamata
- Suborder: Gekkota
- Family: Gekkonidae
- Genus: Ancylodactylus
- Species: A. laikipiensis

Binomial name
- Ancylodactylus laikipiensis Malonza & Bauer, 2022

Species of lizard

Ancylodactylus laikipiensis, commonly known as the Laikipia pygmy forest gecko, is a species of gecko endemic to Kenya.

== Distribution and habitat ==
Ancylodactylus laikipiensis is known only from the montane forests of the Laikipia Plateau in Kenya, where it can be found in rock crevices, tree trunks, and hollows at 1,600–2,000 m (5,200–6,600 ft) above sea level.
