= Cornufer bimaculatus =

Conservation status
- Data Deficient (IUCN 3.1)

Scientific classification
- Kingdom: Animalia
- Phylum: Chordata
- Class: Amphibia
- Order: Anura
- Family: Ceratobatrachidae
- Genus: Platymantis
- Species: P. bimaculatus

Binomial name
- Platymantis bimaculatus Günther, 1999

Synonyms
- Platymantis bimaculata Günther, 1999

Species of frog

Platymantis bimaculatus is a species of frog in the family Ceratobatrachidae. It is endemic to West Papua, Indonesia.

Its natural habitat is subtropical or tropical moist lowland forests. It is threatened by habitat loss.

== Range ==
This species is known only from the type locality in the Wondiwoi Mountains, Papua, Indonesia, from 400-800m above sea level. It probably occurs more widely.

== Habitat and ecology ==
It inhabits primary rainforest and breeds by direct development. The males call from the forest floor, and its eggs are also laid on the ground.

== Sources ==
- Richards, S.; Günther, R. (2004). "Cornufer bimaculatus". IUCN Red List of Threatened Species. 2004 e.T58451A11782786. doi:10.2305/IUCN.UK.2004.RLTS.T58451A11782786.en.
