= African gecko =

Conservation status
- Least Concern (IUCN 3.1)

Scientific classification
- Kingdom: Animalia
- Phylum: Chordata
- Class: Reptilia
- Order: Squamata
- Suborder: Gekkota
- Family: Gekkonidae
- Genus: Ancylodactylus
- Species: A. africanus

Binomial name
- Ancylodactylus africanus Werner, 1895

Synonyms
- Gymnodactylus africanus; Cnemapsis africana

Species of lizard

The African gecko (Ancylodactylus africanus) is a species of gecko found in Central Africa.

Two subspecies have been described before the change from Cnemaspis to Ancylodactylus.

- Cnemaspis africana africana

- Cnemaspis africana elgonensis
