= Hyalaethea malaitaensis =

Scientific classification
- Kingdom: Animalia
- Phylum: Arthropoda
- Clade: Pancrustacea
- Class: Insecta
- Order: Lepidoptera
- Superfamily: Noctuoidea
- Family: Erebidae
- Subfamily: Arctiinae
- Genus: Hyalaethea
- Species: H. malaitaensis

Binomial name
- Hyalaethea malaitaensis Obraztsov, 1953

Species of moth

Hyalaethea malaitaensis is a moth of the subfamily Arctiinae. It was described by Obraztsov in 1953. It is found on the Solomon Islands.
