= Hyalaethea sublutea =

Scientific classification
- Kingdom: Animalia
- Phylum: Arthropoda
- Clade: Pancrustacea
- Class: Insecta
- Order: Lepidoptera
- Superfamily: Noctuoidea
- Family: Erebidae
- Subfamily: Arctiinae
- Genus: Hyalaethea
- Species: H. sublutea

Binomial name
- Hyalaethea sublutea Bethune-Baker, 1908

Species of moth

Hyalaethea sublutea is a moth of the subfamily Arctiinae. It was described by George Thomas Bethune-Baker in 1908. It is found in New Guinea.
