= Tanzania gecko =

Conservation status
- Data Deficient (IUCN 3.1)

Scientific classification
- Kingdom: Animalia
- Phylum: Chordata
- Class: Reptilia
- Order: Squamata
- Suborder: Gekkota
- Family: Gekkonidae
- Genus: Ancylodactylus
- Species: A. uzungwae

Binomial name
- Ancylodactylus uzungwae Perret, 1986

Species of lizard

The Tanzania gecko (Ancylodactylus uzungwae) is a species of gecko endemic to Tanzania.
