= Ancylodactylus chyuluensis =

Conservation status
- Endangered (IUCN 3.1)

Scientific classification
- Kingdom: Animalia
- Phylum: Chordata
- Class: Reptilia
- Order: Squamata
- Suborder: Gekkota
- Family: Gekkonidae
- Genus: Ancylodactylus
- Species: A. chyuluensis

Binomial name
- Ancylodactylus chyuluensis Malonza & Bauer, 2022

Species of lizard

Ancylodactylus chyuluensis is a species of gecko. It is endemic to Kenya.
