= Hyalaethea solomonis =

Scientific classification
- Kingdom: Animalia
- Phylum: Arthropoda
- Clade: Pancrustacea
- Class: Insecta
- Order: Lepidoptera
- Superfamily: Noctuoidea
- Family: Erebidae
- Subfamily: Arctiinae
- Genus: Hyalaethea
- Species: H. solomonis

Binomial name
- Hyalaethea solomonis Hampson

Synonyms
- Hyalaethea meeki Rothschild, 1910

Species of moth

Hyalaethea solomonis is a moth of the subfamily Arctiinae. It was described by George Hampson. It is found on the Solomon Islands.

The wingspan is about 32 mm. The forewings are hyaline with black-brown veins and margins. The base of the inner margin has some orange and there are black-brown fasciae from the cell to the termen between veins six and five and three and two. The hindwings are hyaline.
