= Ancylodactylus spinicollis =

Scientific classification
- Kingdom: Animalia
- Phylum: Chordata
- Class: Reptilia
- Order: Squamata
- Suborder: Gekkota
- Family: Gekkonidae
- Genus: Ancylodactylus
- Species: A. spinicollis

Binomial name
- Ancylodactylus spinicollis (Müller, 1907)

Synonyms
- Ancylodactylus spinicollis

Species of lizard

Ancylodactylus spinicollis is a species of gecko endemic to western Africa.
