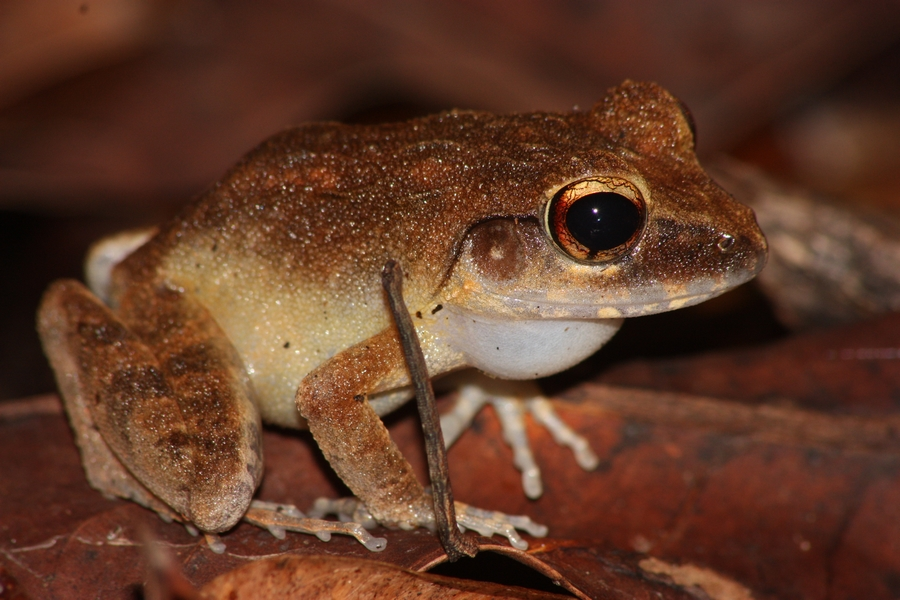
- C. papuensis calling on the forest floor on Normanby Is., Papua New Guinea

Conservation status
- Least Concern (IUCN 3.1)

Scientific classification
- Kingdom: Animalia
- Phylum: Chordata
- Class: Amphibia
- Order: Anura
- Family: Ceratobatrachidae
- Genus: Cornufer
- Species: C. papuensis

Binomial name
- Cornufer papuensis (Meyer, 1875)

Synonyms
- Platymantis corrugata var. papuensis Meyer, 1875 "1874"; Cornufer corrugatus rubristriatus Barbour, 1908; Cornufer moszkowskii Vogt, 1912; Platymantis papuensis (Meyer, 1875)

= Cornufer papuensis =

Species of frog

Cornufer papuensis is a species of frog in the family Ceratobatrachidae. It is found in the northern parts of New Guinea and in many surrounding islands, including the Bismarck Archipelago, D'Entrecasteaux Islands, Trobriand Islands (Papua New Guinea), and Maluku Islands including Sula Islands and Seram Island (Indonesia). Common name Papua wrinkled ground frog has been coined for the species.

== Description ==
Males can grow to 46 mm (1.8 in) and females to 64 mm (2.5 in) in snout–vent length. The toes have a trace of basal webbing. The dorsum has numerous short skin folds. There are three dorsal color patterns morphs: unicolored, two-striped (dorsolateral stripes), and one-striped (vertebral stripe).

The male advertisement call is loud and consists of partly clustered pulses. Note length is 96–157 ms and inter-note length is 130–306 ms. Note repetition rate is relatively low at 4 per second.

== Habitat and conservation ==
Cornufer papuensis is a very common species in much of its range and occurs in a variety of habitats from primary rain forest to secondary regrowth, gardens, and other heavily disturbed habitats. It is a lowland species occurring at elevations below 1,200 m (3,900 ft). Males call at night, but sometimes start well before sunset. They call from the floor of the rain forest, usually taking an exposed or slightly sheltered position on the leaf litter, but may sometimes call from low shrubs.

There are no known threats to this widespread and adaptable species. Furthermore, it occurs in many protected areas.
