= Cornufer bufoniformis =

Conservation status
- Least Concern (IUCN 3.1)

Scientific classification
- Kingdom: Animalia
- Phylum: Chordata
- Class: Amphibia
- Order: Anura
- Family: Ceratobatrachidae
- Genus: Cornufer
- Species: C. bufoniformis

Binomial name
- Cornufer bufoniformis (Boulenger, 1884)

Synonyms
- Rana bufoniformis Boulenger, 1884; Discodeles bufoniformis (Boulenger, 1884)

Species of amphibian

Cornufer bufoniformis, commonly known as the warty webbed frog or Treasury Island webbed frog, is a species of frog in the family Ceratobatrachidae. It is endemic to the Solomon Islands archipelago where it is widespread, but it is missing from Guadalcanal and Makira islands. It is a common species though it occurs patchily. It inhabits small streams in lowland rainforests. It also tolerates some habitat degradation, provided that vegetation is left along the streams. It is locally impacted by habitat loss caused by logging, and it is also used for human consumption.
