= Cornufer latro =

Conservation status
- Least Concern (IUCN 3.1)

Scientific classification
- Kingdom: Animalia
- Phylum: Chordata
- Class: Amphibia
- Order: Anura
- Family: Ceratobatrachidae
- Genus: Cornufer
- Species: C. latro

Binomial name
- Cornufer latro (Richards, Mack, and Austin, 2007)

Synonyms
- Platymantis latro Richards, Mack, and Austin, 2007; Cornufer (Aenigmanura) latro Brown, Siler, Richards, Diesmos, and Cannatella, 2015

Species of frog

Cornufer latro is a species of frog in the family Ceratobatrachidae endemic to Papua New Guinea. It has been observed in the Admiralty Archipelago on the Pak, Rambutyo, Manus and Los Negros Islands. Scientists first found it near Tulu Village, 20 meters above sea level.

== Original description ==
- Stephen J. Richards; Andrew L. Mack; Christopher C. Austin (November 16, 2007). "Two new species of Platymantis (Anura: Ceratobatrachidae) from the Admiralty Archipelago, Papua New Guinea". Zootaxa (Abstract). 1639 (1): 41–59. doi:10.11646/zootaxa.1639.1.3.
