= Cornufer solomonis =

Conservation status
- Least Concern (IUCN 3.1)

Scientific classification
- Kingdom: Animalia
- Phylum: Chordata
- Class: Amphibia
- Order: Anura
- Family: Ceratobatrachidae
- Genus: Cornufer
- Species: C. solomonis

Binomial name
- Cornufer solomonis Boulenger, 1884

Synonyms
- Platymantis solomonis (Boulenger, 1884)

Species of frog

Cornufer solomonis is a species of frog in the family Ceratobatrachidae. It is found in Papua New Guinea and Solomon Islands. Its natural habitats are subtropical or tropical moist lowland forests, plantations, rural gardens, and heavily degraded former forest.
