= Cornufer wuenscheorum =

Conservation status
- Data Deficient (IUCN 3.1)

Scientific classification
- Kingdom: Animalia
- Phylum: Chordata
- Class: Amphibia
- Order: Anura
- Family: Ceratobatrachidae
- Genus: Cornufer
- Species: C. wuenscheorum

Binomial name
- Cornufer wuenscheorum (Günther, 2006)

Synonyms
- Platymantis wuenscheorum Günther, 2006 "2005"

Species of amphibian

Cornufer wuenscheorum is a species of frogs in the family Ceratobatrachidae. It is endemic to Yapen island in Indonesia, off the northern coast of New Guinea. The specific name wuenscheorum honours Rosi and Jochen Wünsche, friends of the scientist who described the species.

== Description ==
Adult males measure 23–29 mm (0.9–1.1 in) in snout–vent length; females are unknown. The snout is slightly acuminate in dorsal view and rounded in profile. The canthus rostralis is distinct and straight. The tympanum is distinct; the supra-tympanic fold is moderately developed. There are distinct dorso-lateral skin folds; between them, there are two narrow and elongate para-vertebral dermal ridges. Neither the fingers nor the toes are webbed. The dorsum is pale grey-brown to red-brown to dark grey-brown and the para-vertebral ridges are red-orange. There are some scattered brown to blackish spots as well as longitudinal stripes below the dorso-lateral folds. The upper arms are ochre or brown. The lower surfaces are whitish with grey mottling.

The male advertisement call is a double-click, emitted singly or in series up to six. The dominant frequency of the first part is 2.75 kHz and that of the second part 2.5 kHz.

Cornufer wuenscheorum is only known from Yapen island near New Guinea.

== Habitat and conservation ==
Cornufer wuenscheorum is known from primary rainforest at elevations of 900–1,150 m (2,950–3,770 ft) above sea level. Specimens have been found on leaf litter or directly on the soil, but not hidden nor climbing. Calling starts at twilight and continues at least to early night. The species was abundant in the area of the type locality. There are no known threats to it, but if clearcutting were to occur, it would likely be detrimental.
