= Cornufer vertebralis =

Conservation status
- Least Concern (IUCN 3.1)

Scientific classification
- Kingdom: Animalia
- Phylum: Chordata
- Class: Amphibia
- Order: Anura
- Family: Ceratobatrachidae
- Genus: Cornufer
- Species: C. vertebralis

Binomial name
- Cornufer vertebralis (Boulenger, 1887)

Synonyms
- Batrachylodes vertebralis Boulenger, 1887

Species of frog

Cornufer vertebralis is a species of frog in the family Ceratobatrachidae. It is found in Papua New Guinea and Solomon Islands. Its natural habitats are subtropical or tropical moist lowland forests, rural gardens, and heavily degraded former forest. It has been observed as high above sea level as 350 meters up. It is threatened by habitat loss.
