= Western gecko =

Conservation status
- Endangered (IUCN 3.1)

Scientific classification
- Kingdom: Animalia
- Phylum: Chordata
- Class: Reptilia
- Order: Squamata
- Suborder: Gekkota
- Family: Gekkonidae
- Genus: Ancylodactylus
- Species: A. occidentalis

Binomial name
- Ancylodactylus occidentalis Angel, 1943

Synonyms
- Cnemaspis africana occidentalis

Species of lizard

The western gecko (Ancylodactylus occidentalis) is a species of gecko found in Guinea, Sierra Leone, and Ivory Coast.
