= Ancylodactylus dickersonae =

Conservation status
- Least Concern (IUCN 3.1)

Scientific classification
- Kingdom: Animalia
- Phylum: Chordata
- Class: Reptilia
- Order: Squamata
- Suborder: Gekkota
- Family: Gekkonidae
- Genus: Ancylodactylus
- Species: A. dickersonae

Binomial name
- Ancylodactylus dickersonae (Schmidt, 1919)

Synonyms
- Gonatodes dickersoni Schmidt, 1919; Paragonatodes dickersoni — Noble, 1921; Cnemaspis dickersoni — Loveridge, 1936; Cnemaspis (Ancyclodactylus) dickersoni — Rösler, 2000; Cnemaspis dickersonae — Michels & Bauer, 2004; Ancyclodactylus dickersonae – Malonza & Bauer, 2022

Species of lizard

Ancylodactylus dickersonae, also known commonly as Dickerson's forest gecko, Dickerson's gecko, and the four-lined forest gecko, is a species of lizard in the family Gekkonidae. The species is endemic to Africa.

== Etymology ==
The specific name, dickersonae, is in honor of American herpetologist Mary Cynthia Dickerson.

== Geographic range ==
A. dickersonae is found in the Democratic Republic of the Congo, Ethiopia, Kenya, Rwanda, South Sudan, Tanzania, and Uganda.

== Habitat ==
The preferred natural habitat of A. dickersonae is forest, at elevations of 400–2,200 m (1,300–7,200 ft).

== Reproduction ==
A. dickersonae is oviparous.
