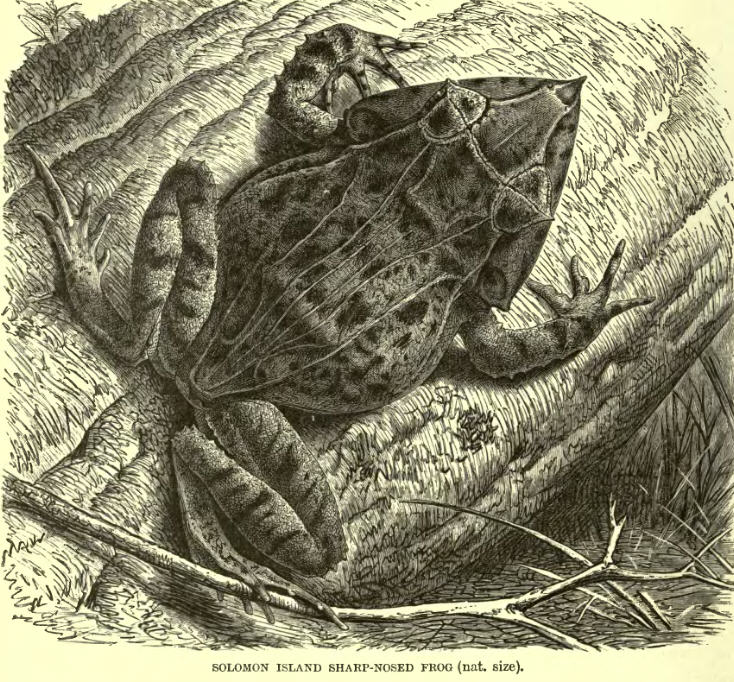
- Cornufer guentheri

Scientific classification
- Kingdom: Animalia
- Phylum: Chordata
- Class: Amphibia
- Order: Anura
- Clade: Ranoidea
- Family: Ceratobatrachidae; Boulenger, 1884

Type genus
- Ceratobatrachus Boulenger, 1884

Genera
- 5, see text.

Synonyms
- Ceratobatrachinae

= Ceratobatrachidae =

Family of amphibians

The Ceratobatrachidae are a family of frogs found in the Malay Peninsula, Borneo, the Philippines, Palau, Fiji, New Guinea, and the Admiralty, Bismarck, and Solomon Islands.

== Taxonomy ==
Ceratobatrachidae was formerly treated as a subfamily (i.e., Ceratobatrachinae) in the family Ranidae (true frogs), but have now been re-classified as a separate family. The following genera are recognised:

- Subfamily Alcalinae Brown, Siler, Richards, Diesmos, and Cannatella, 2015
  - Alcalus (5 species)
- Subfamily Ceratobatrachinae Boulenger, 1884
  - Cornufer Tschudi, 1838 (> 50 species)
  - Platymantis Günther, 1858 (> 30 species)
- Subfamily Liuraninae Fei, Ye, and Jiang, 2010
  - Liurana Dubois, 1987 (4 species)

Formerly, the following genera were also recognized in the family Ceratobatrachidae, but have now been merged into the genera above.

- Batrachylodes Boulenger, 1887 (8 species)
- Palmatorappia Ahl, 1927 (1 species)
- Ceratobatrachus Boulenger, 1884 (1 species)
- Discodeles Boulenger, 1918 (5 species)

== Distribution ==
Ceratobatrachidae is distributed across Island Southeast Asia, as well as in the Eastern Himalayas.

Genus Liurana

- Eastern Himalayas: 4 species

Genus Alcalus

- Borneo: 2 species (Alcalus baluensis and Alcalus rajae)
- Palawan: 1 species (Alcalus mariae)

Genus Platymantis

- Philippines:

Genus Cornufer

- Palau: 1 species
- Maluku: 3–4 species
- New Guinea: 6–8 species
- Bismarck Archipelago: 18–22 species
- Solomon Islands: 20–25 species
- Fiji: 2 species

== Life history ==
All Ceratobatrachidae lay eggs outside of water and undergo direct development where eggs hatch directly into froglets, without free-living tadpole stages.
