= Hederagenin =

Names
- IUPAC name 3β,23-Dihydroxyolean-12-en-28-oic acid
- Systematic IUPAC name (4aS,6aS,6bR,8aR,9R,10S,12aR,12bR,14bS)-9-Hydroxy-9-(hydroxymethyl)-2,2,6a,6b,9,12a-hexamethyl-1,3,4,5,6,6a,6b,7,8,8a,9,10,11,12,12a,12b,13,14b-octadecahydropicene-4a(2H)-carboxylic acid

Identifiers
CAS Number	465-99-6
3D model (JSmol)	Interactive image
ChEBI	CHEBI:69579
ChEMBL	ChEMBL486400
ChemSpider	66038
ECHA InfoCard	100.006.701
PubChem CID	73299
UNII	RQF57J8212
CompTox Dashboard (EPA)	DTXSID301029412
- InChI: InChI=1S/C30H48O4/c1-25(2)13-15-30(24(33)34)16-14-28(5)19(20(30)17-25)7-8-22-26(3)11-10-23(32)27(4,18-31)21(26)9-12-29(22,28)6/h7,20-23,31-32H,8-18H2,1-6H3,(H,33,34)/t20-,21+,22+,23-,26-,27-,28+,29+,30-/m0/s1 Key: PGOYMURMZNDHNS-MYPRUECHSA-N; InChI=1/C30H48O4/c1-25(2)13-15-30(24(33)34)16-14-28(5)19(20(30)17-25)7-8-22-26(3)11-10-23(32)27(4,18-31)21(26)9-12-29(22,28)6/h7,20-23,31-32H,8-18H2,1-6H3,(H,33,34)/t20-,21+,22+,23-,26-,27-,28+,29+,30-/m0/s1 Key: PGOYMURMZNDHNS-MYPRUECHBG
- SMILES: O=C(O)[C@]35[C@H](C\2=C\C[C@@H]1[C@@]4([C@@H](CC[C@]1([C@]/2(C)CC3)C)[C@](C)(CO)[C@@H](O)CC4)C)CC(C)(C)CC5

Properties
Chemical formula	C_{30}H_{48}O_{4}
Molar mass	472.710 g·mol^{−1}
- Except where otherwise noted, data are given for materials in their standard state (at 25 °C [77 °F], 100 kPa). verify (what is ?) Infobox references

Hederagenin is a triterpenoid which is a chemical constituent of the Hedera helix plant.

Hederagenin is the aglycone part of numerous saponins found in Hedera helix (common ivy), the most prevalent of these being hederacoside C and alpha-hederin. It is also one of three primary triterpenoids extracted from the Chenopodium quinoa plant categorized by the EPA as a biopesticide. HeadsUp Plant Protectant is made up of approximately equal ratios of the saponin aglycones oleanolic acid, hederagenin, and phytolaccagenic acid and is intended for use as a seed treatment on tuber (e.g. potato seed pieces), legume, and cereal seeds or as a pre-plant root dip for roots of transplants, at planting, to prevent fungal growth, bacterial growth, and viral plant diseases.

Hederagenin has been found to have antidepressant-like effects in a rodent models. It has been shown to act as an antagonist of the NPFF1 receptor.

== History ==
Hederagenin was discovered by L. Posselt in 1849 and named hederic acid. However, Posselt was not able to isolate a pure substance or obtain an exact formula: his hederic acid was hederagenin mixed with some tannin impurity.

== Related triterpenes ==
All of these compounds share the same pentacyclic framework:

- Betulinic acid
- Boswellic acid
- Glycyrrhetinic acid
- Moronic acid
- Oleanolic acid
- Ursolic acid
- Corosolic acid
- Amyrin
- Lupeol
- Maslinic acid
- Hopane
