= C30H48O4 =

The molecular formula C_{30}H_{48}O_{4} (molar mass: 472.70 g/mol, exact mass: 472.3553 u) may refer to:

- Corosolic acid
- Ganodermanontriol
- Hederagenin
- Maslinic acid
