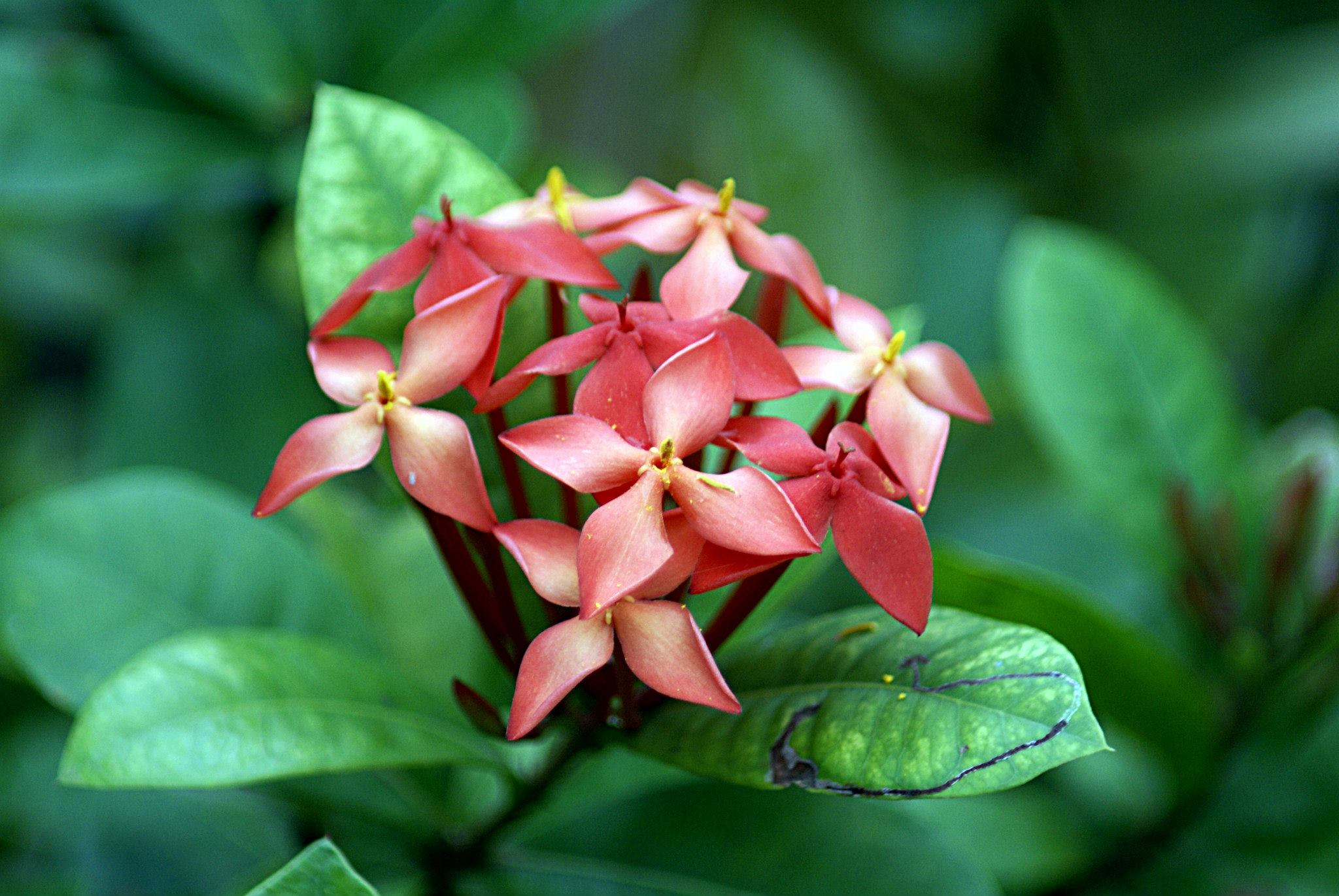
- Ixora coccinea in Kerala, India

Scientific classification
- Kingdom: Plantae
- Clade: Tracheophytes
- Clade: Angiosperms
- Clade: Eudicots
- Clade: Asterids
- Order: Gentianales
- Family: Rubiaceae
- Genus: Ixora
- Species: I. coccinea

Binomial name
- Ixora coccinea L.

= Ixora coccinea =

Species of flowering plant

Ixora coccinea (also known as jungle geranium, flame of the woods or jungle flame or pendkuli) is a species of flowering plant in the family Rubiaceae. It is a common flowering shrub native to Southern India, Bangladesh, and Sri Lanka. It has become one of the most popular flowering shrubs in South Florida gardens and landscapes. It is the national flower of Suriname.

== Description ==
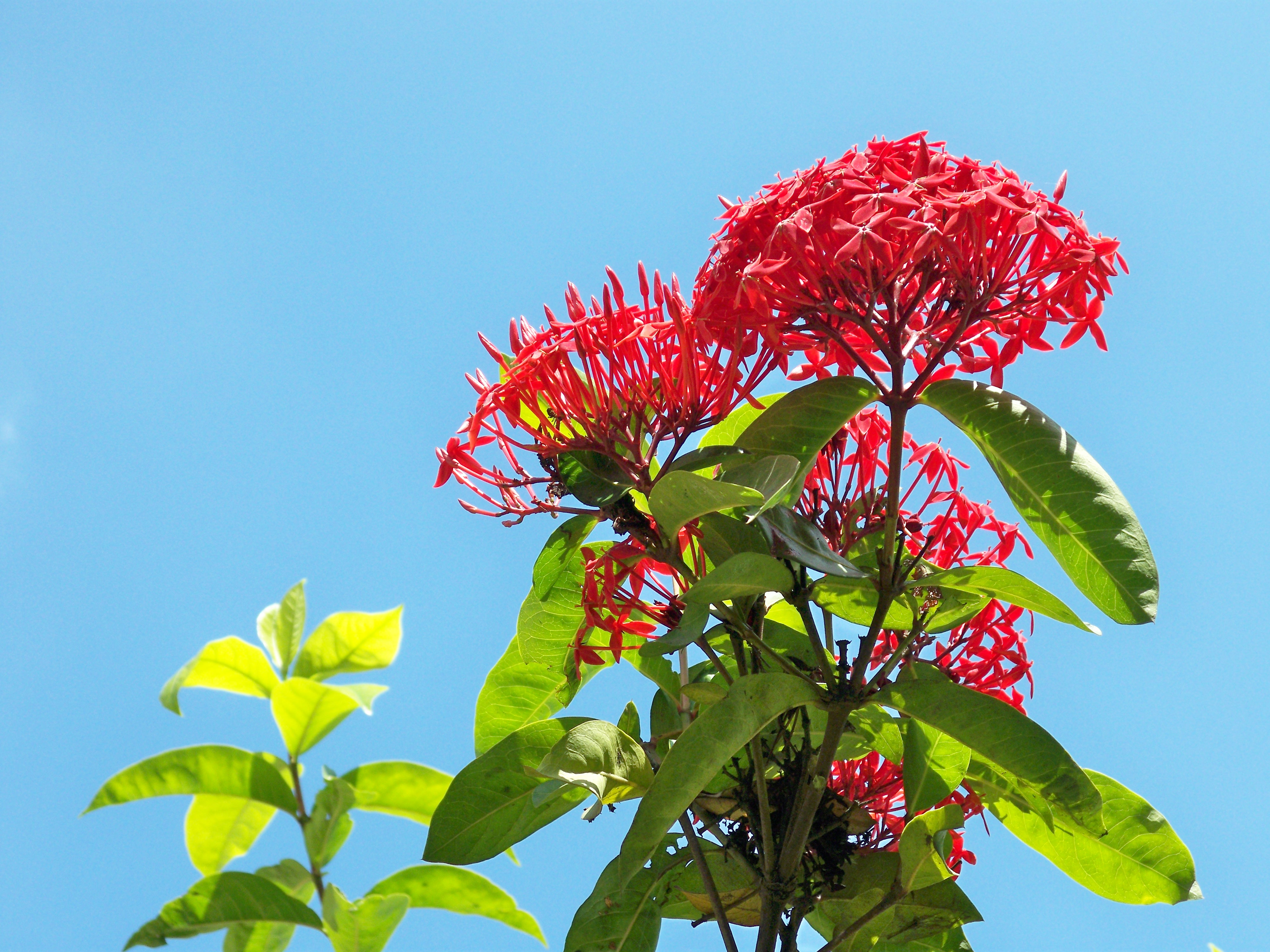
A pink Ixora coccinea in India

Ixora coccinea is a dense, multi-branched evergreen shrub, commonly 4–6 ft (1.2–1.8 m) in height, but capable of reaching up to 12 ft (3.7 m) high. It has a rounded form, with a spread that may exceed its height. The glossy, leathery, oblong leaves are about 4 in (10 cm) long, with entire margins, and are carried in opposite pairs or whorled on the stems. Small tubular, scarlet flowers in dense rounded clusters 2–5 in (5.1–12.7 cm) across are produced almost all year long.

== Cultivation and use ==
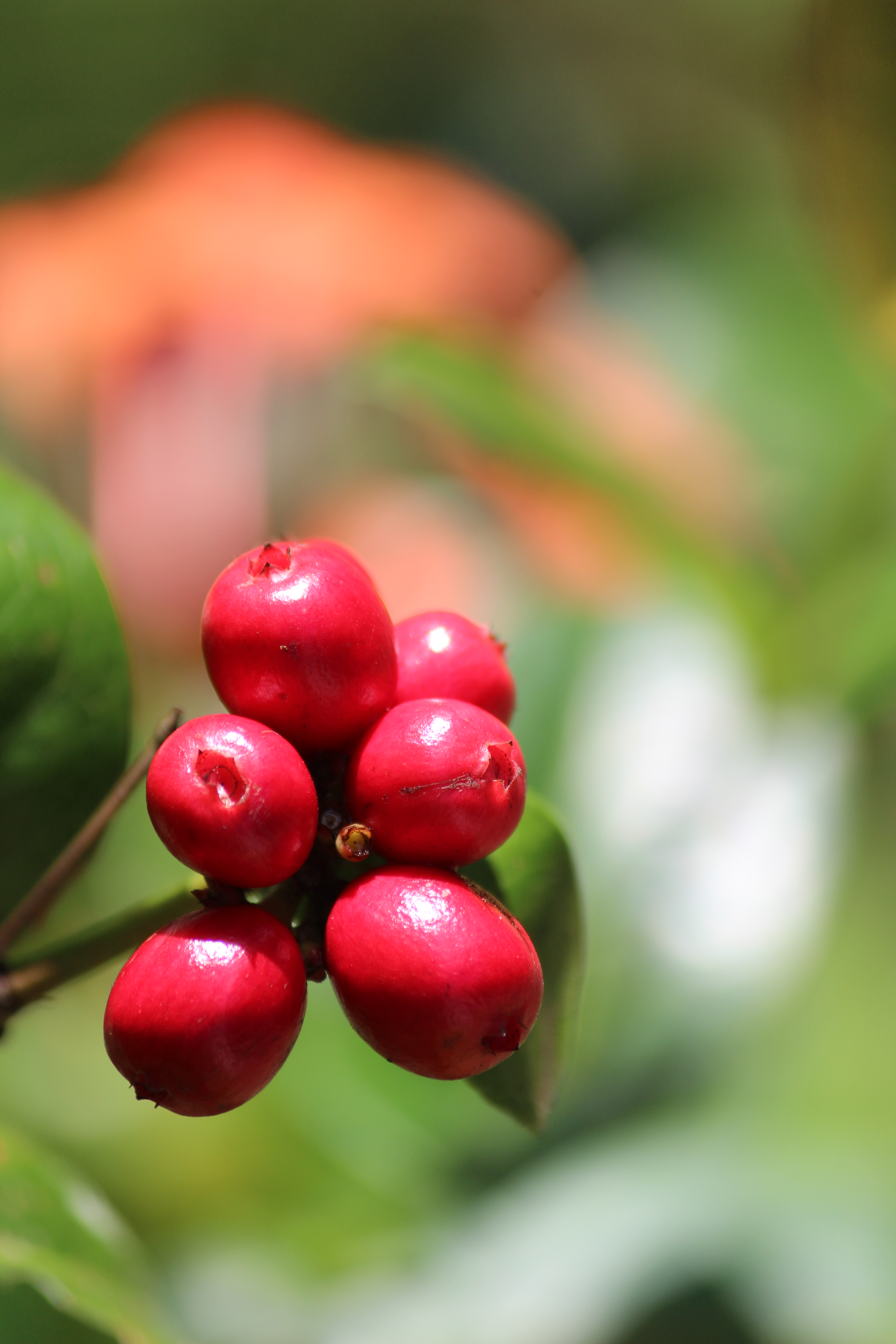
Fruits

Although there are around 500 species in the genus Ixora, only a handful are commonly cultivated, and the common name, Ixora, is usually used for I. coccinea. I. coccinea is used in warm climates for hedges and screens, foundation plantings, massed in flowering beds, or grown as a specimen shrub or small tree. In cooler climate, it is grown in a greenhouse or as a potted house plant requiring bright light. I. coccinea is also grown in containers, looking very distinguished as a patio or poolside plant. This tight, compact shrub is much branched and tolerates hard pruning, making it ideal for formal hedges, although it is at its best when not sheared.

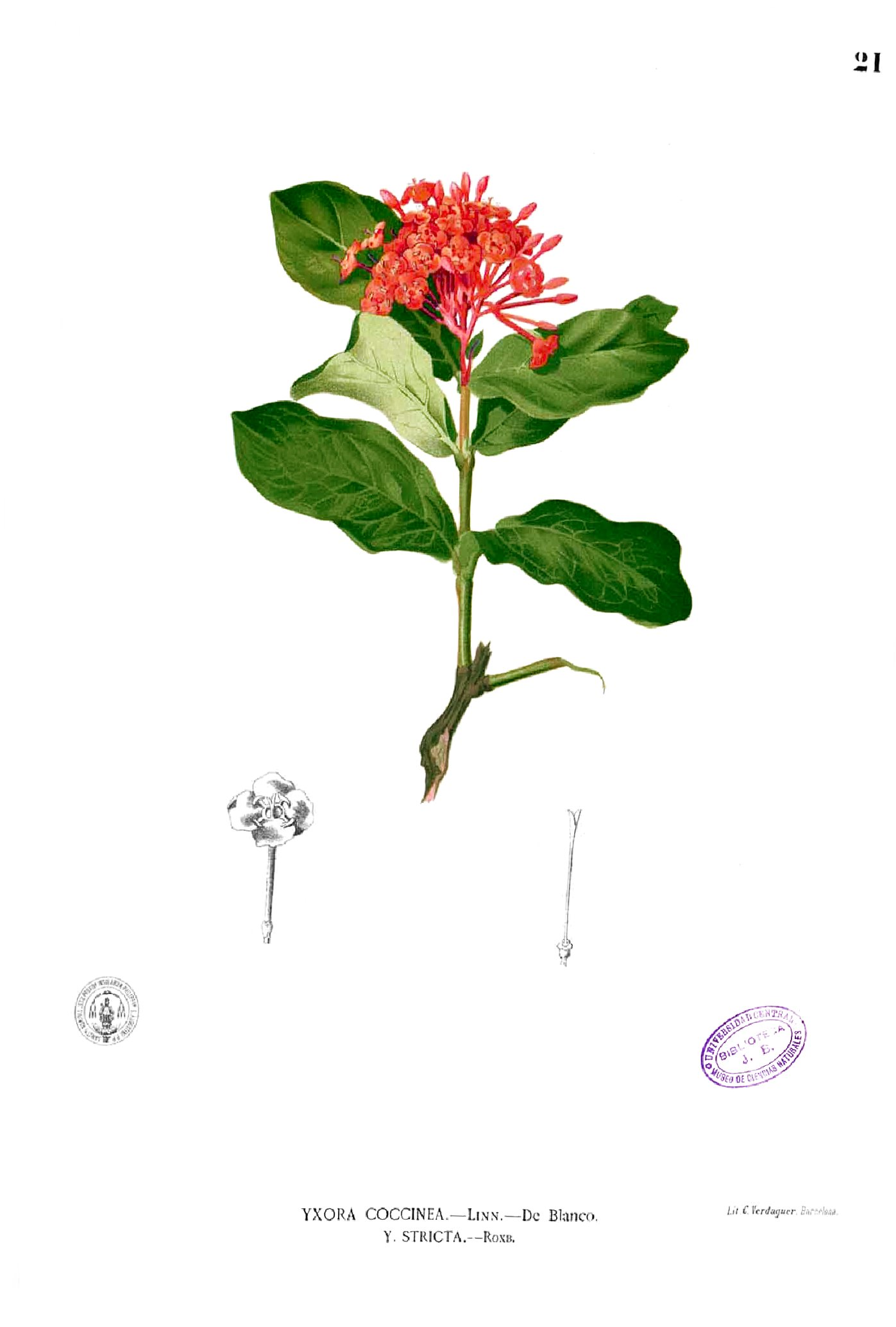
Illustration by Manuel Blanco Ramos

There are numerous named cultivars differing in flower colour (yellow, pink, orange) and plant size. Several popular cultivars are dwarfs, usually staying under 3 ft (0.91 m) in height. Nora Grant is a popular dwarf and Super King is a popular hybrid with much larger flower clusters. Many new cultivars and hybrids of I. coccinea have come to market in the last couple of decades, leading to a resurgence in popularity for the beautiful flame-of-the-woods.

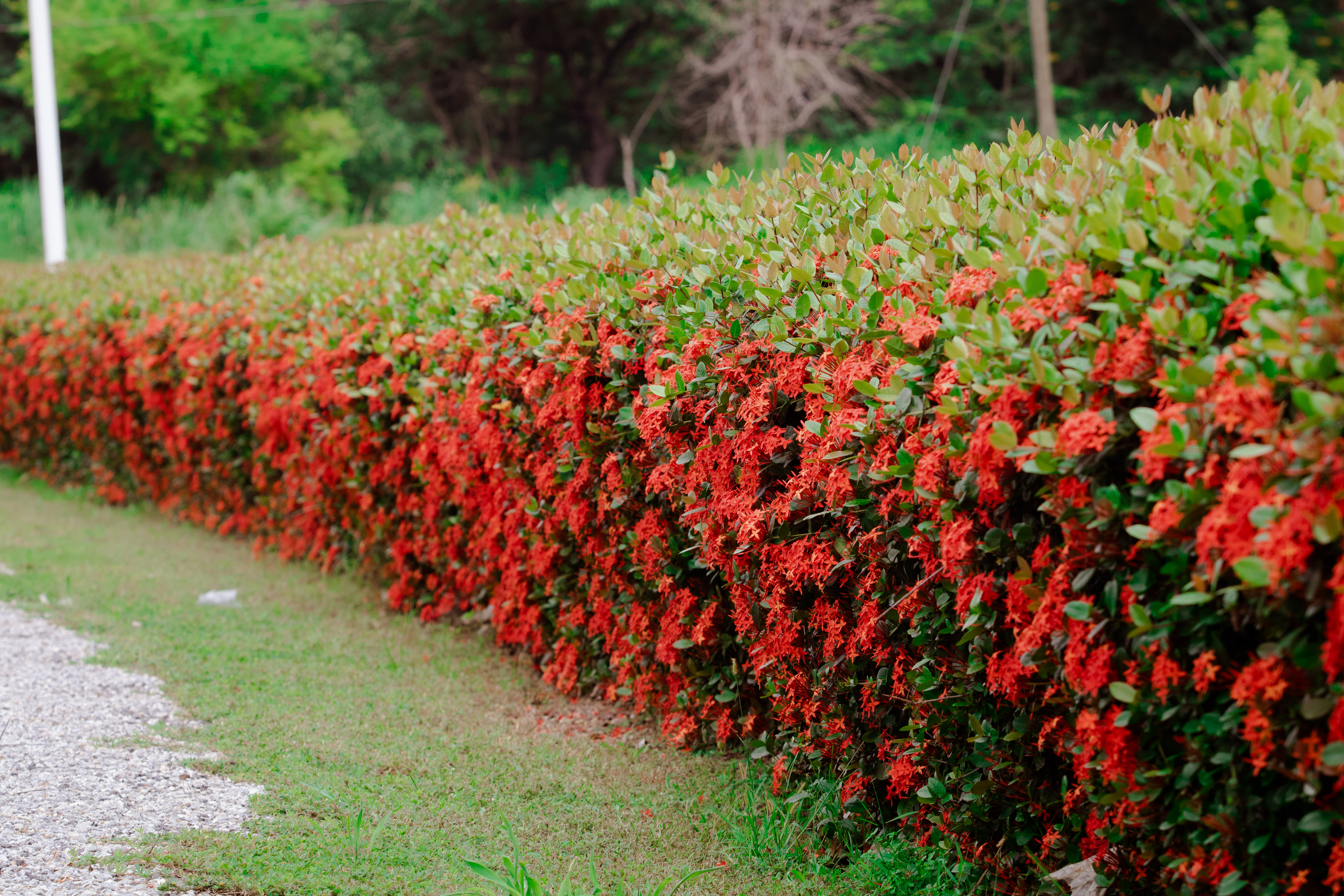
Ixora coccinea at Bui National Park in Ghana

The flowers, leaves, roots, and the stem are used to treat various ailments in the Indian traditional system of medicine, the Ayurveda, and in various folk medicines, in traditional Indian medicine the fusion of juice leaves and the fruit of Ixora coccinea is used to care for dysentery, ulcers and gonorrhea.

== Chemical constituents ==
Phytochemical studies indicate that the plant contains the phytochemicals lupeol, ursolic acid, oleanolic acid, sitosterol, rutin, lecocyanadin, anthocyanins, proanthocyanidins, and glycosides of kaempferol and quercetin.

== Taxonomy ==
Ixora coccinea was first described in 1753 by Carl Linnaeus in his Species Plantarum 1: 110.

== Ixora cultivars ==
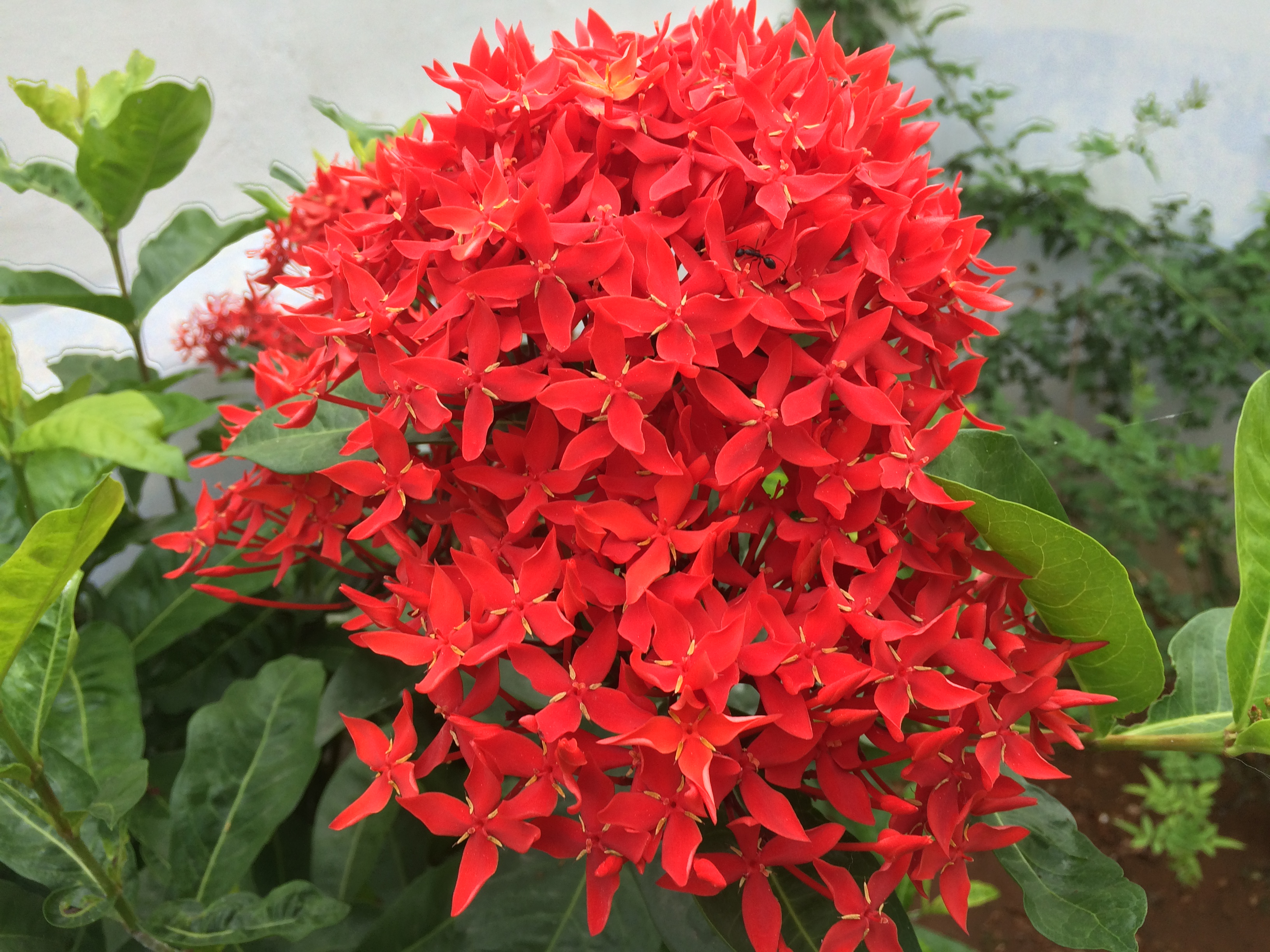

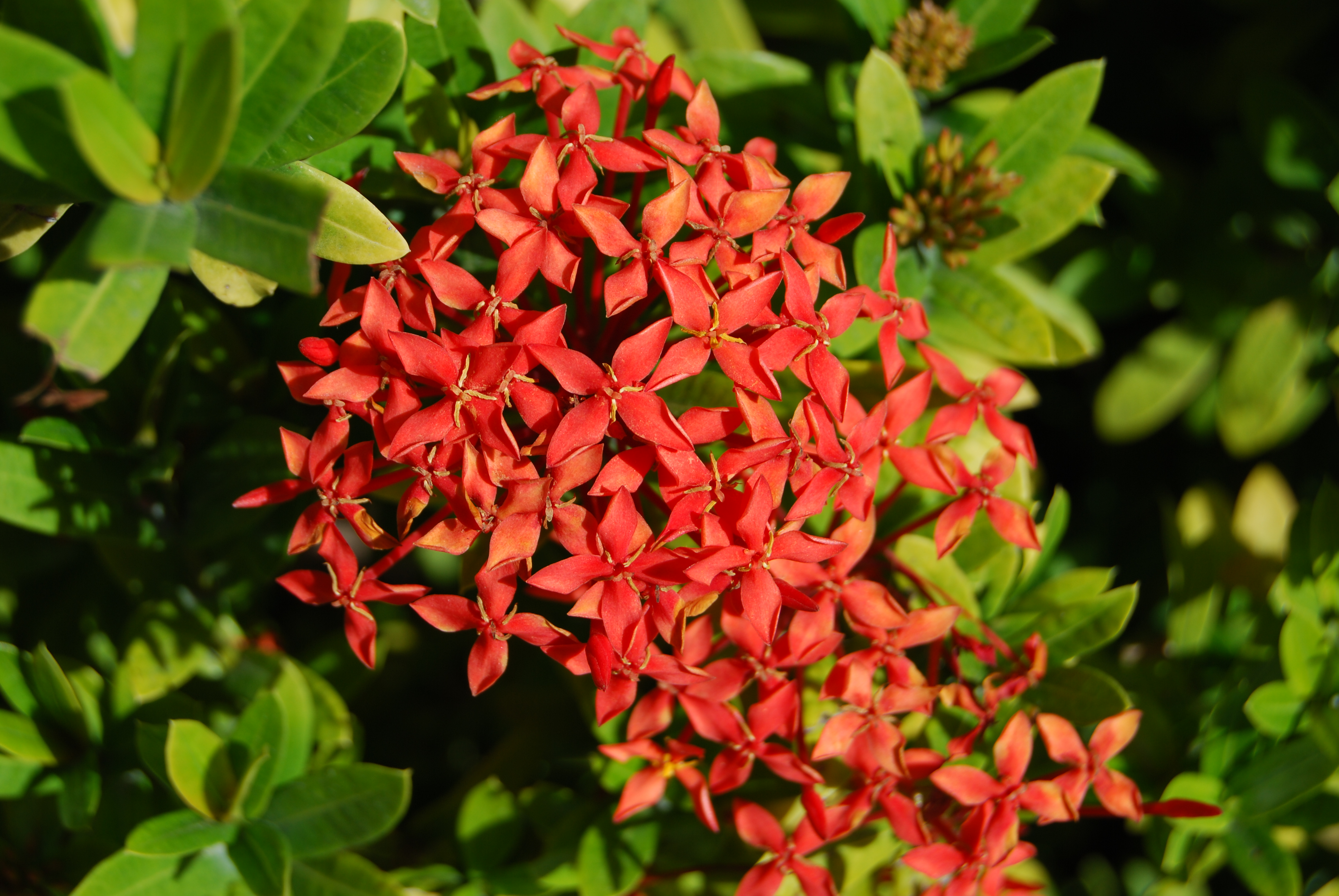

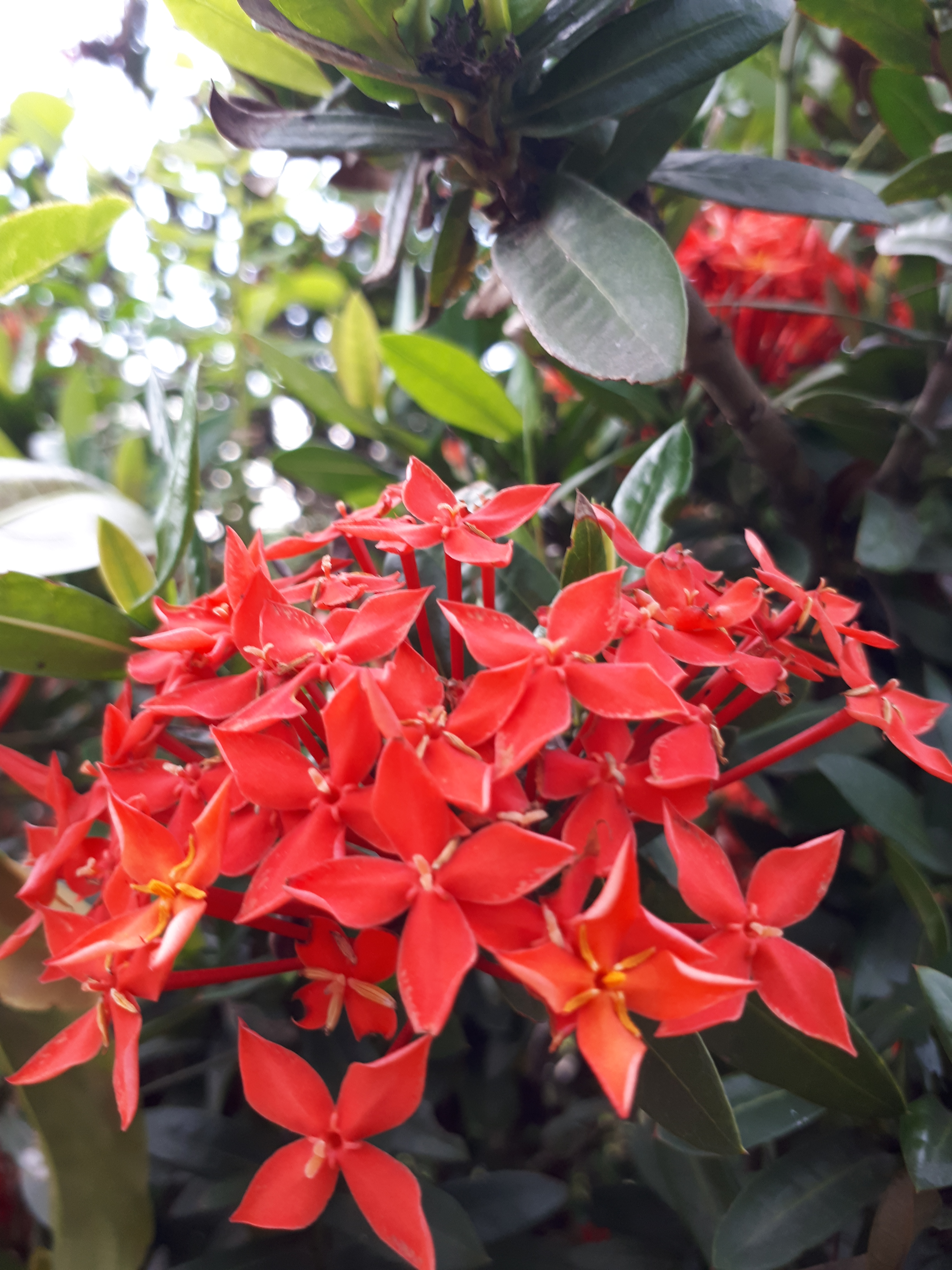

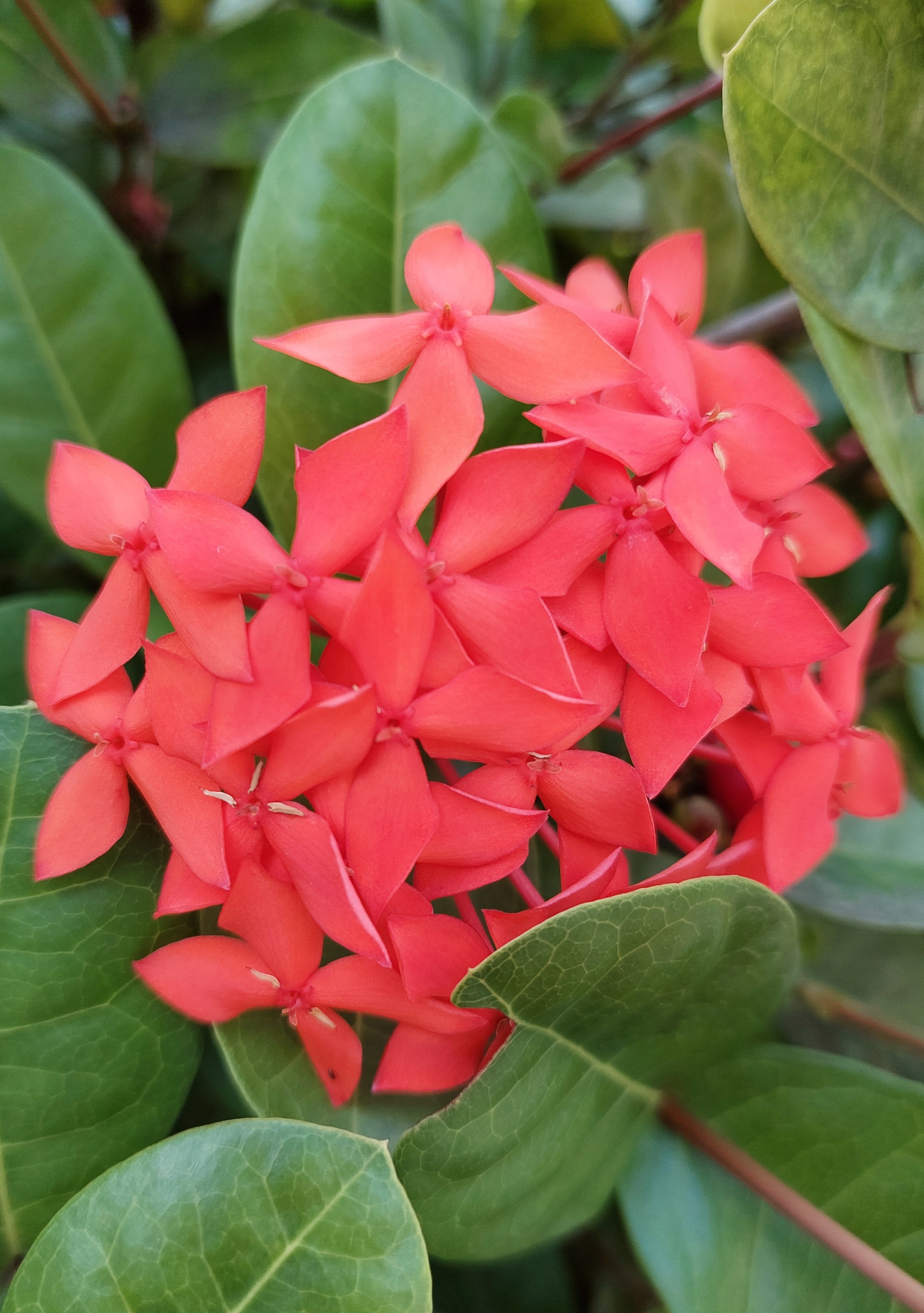

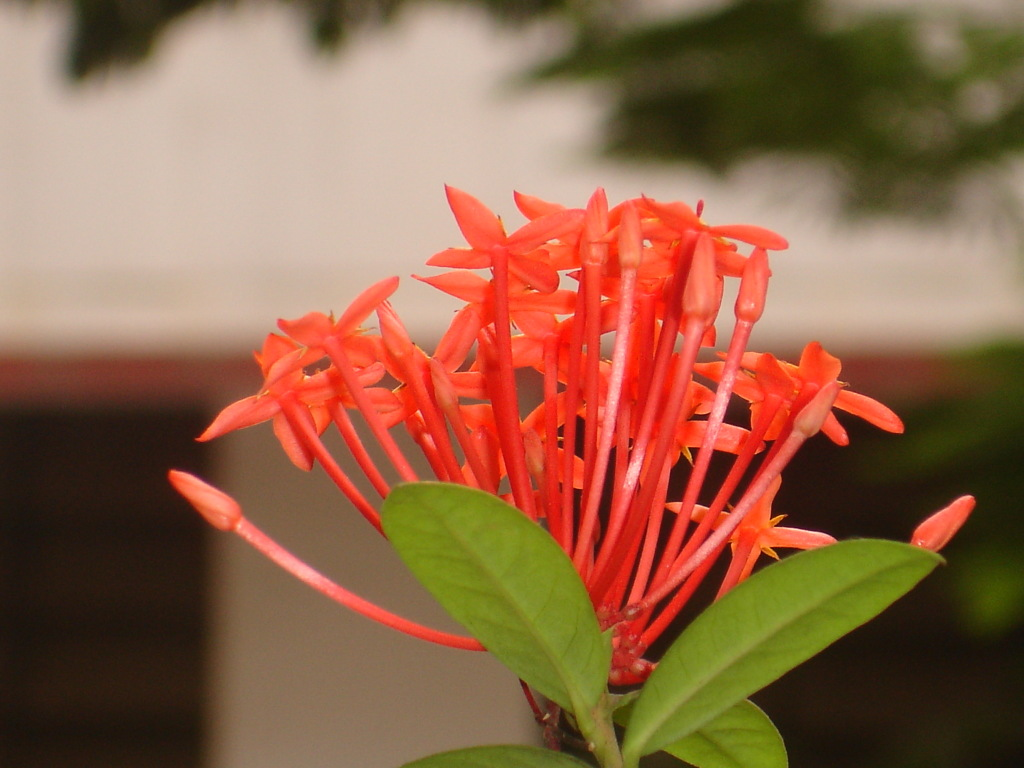

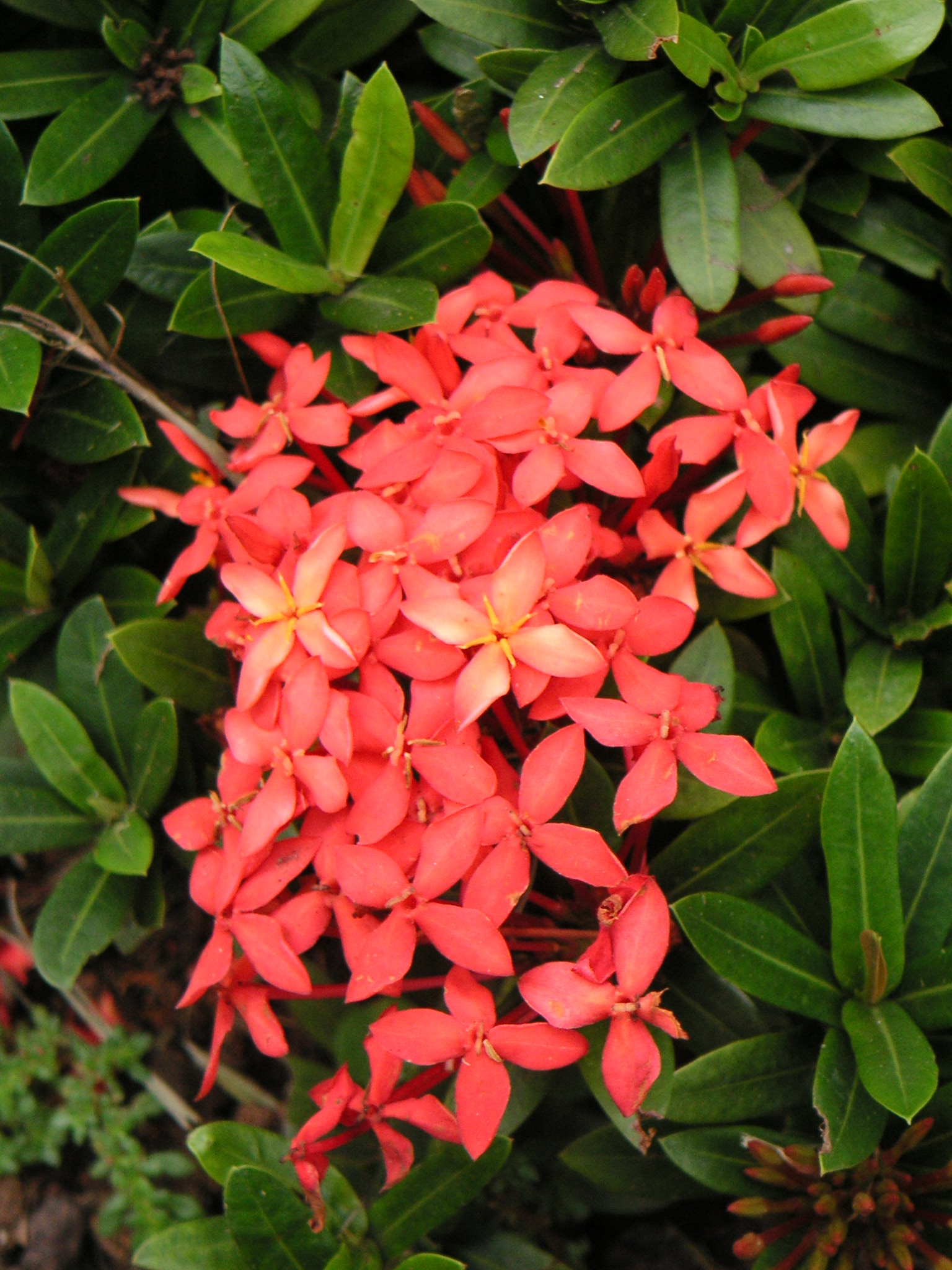

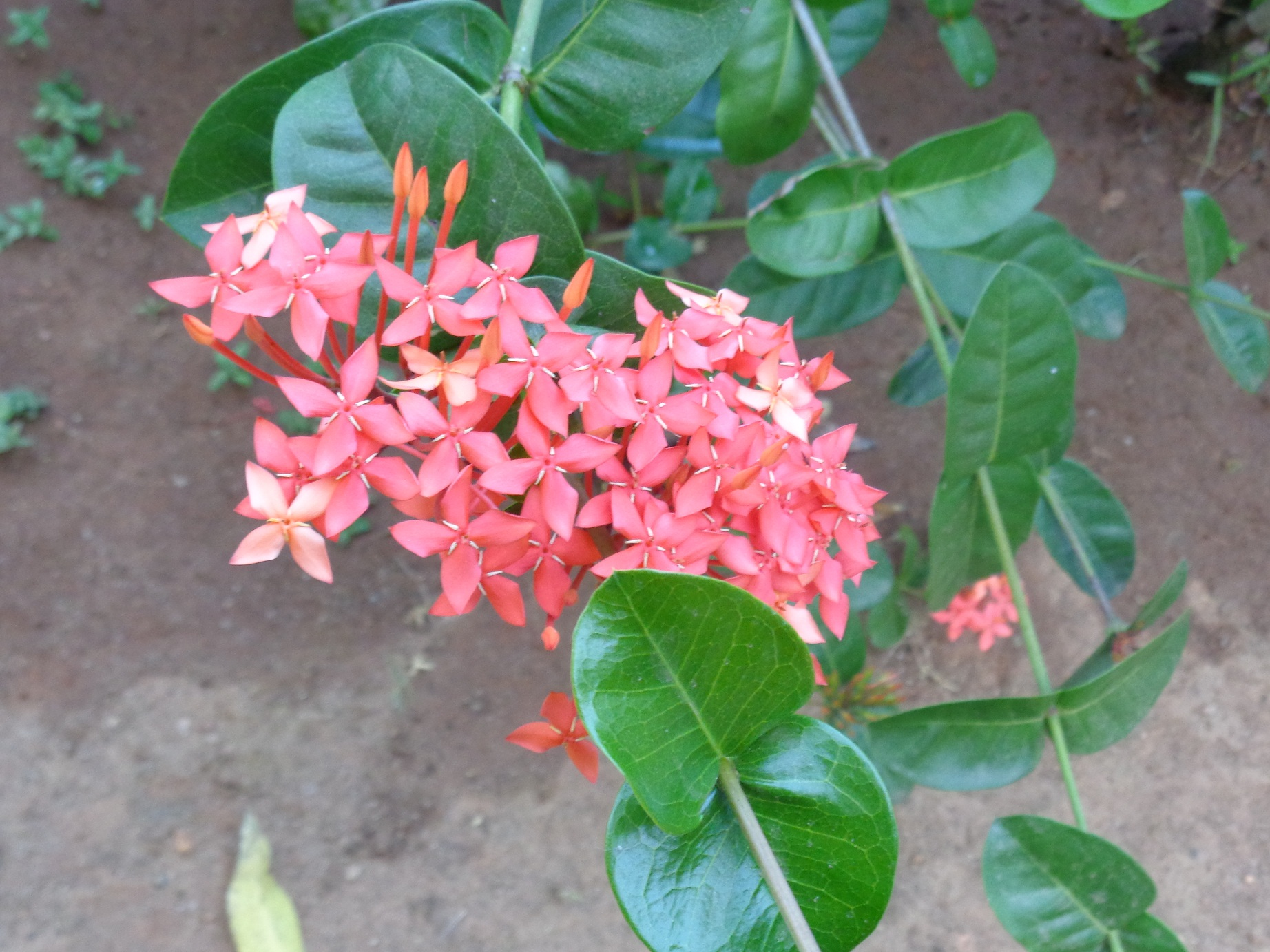

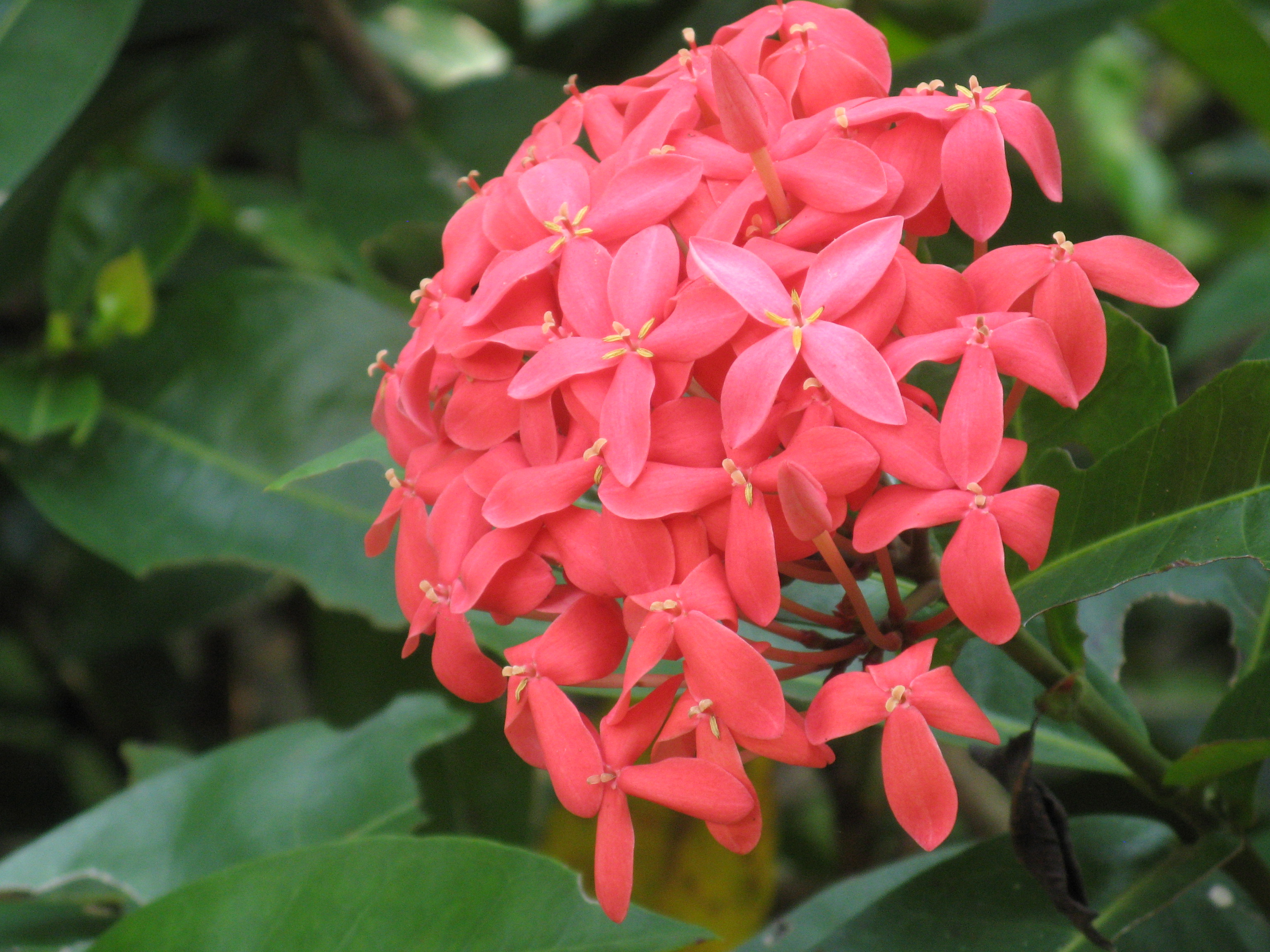

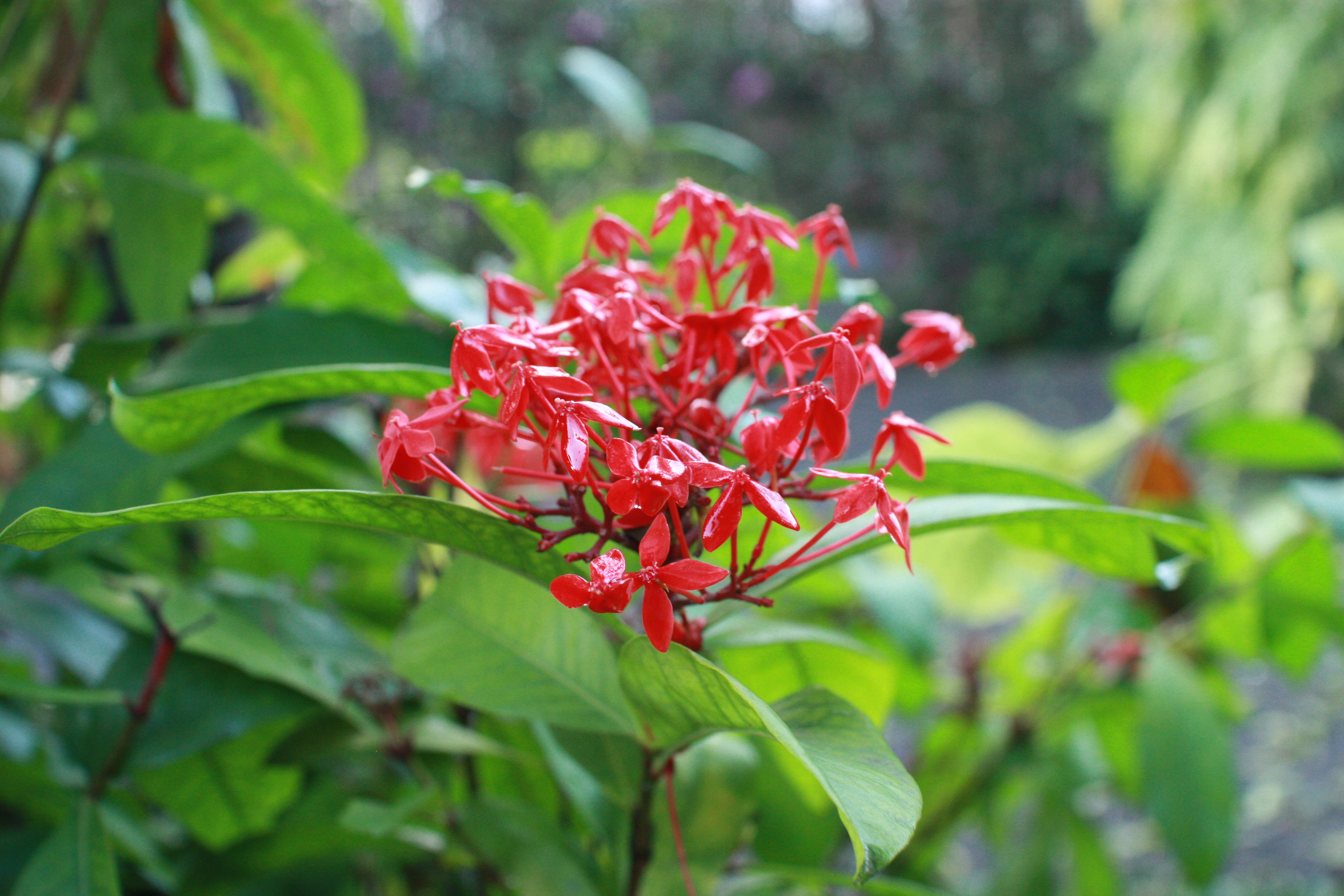

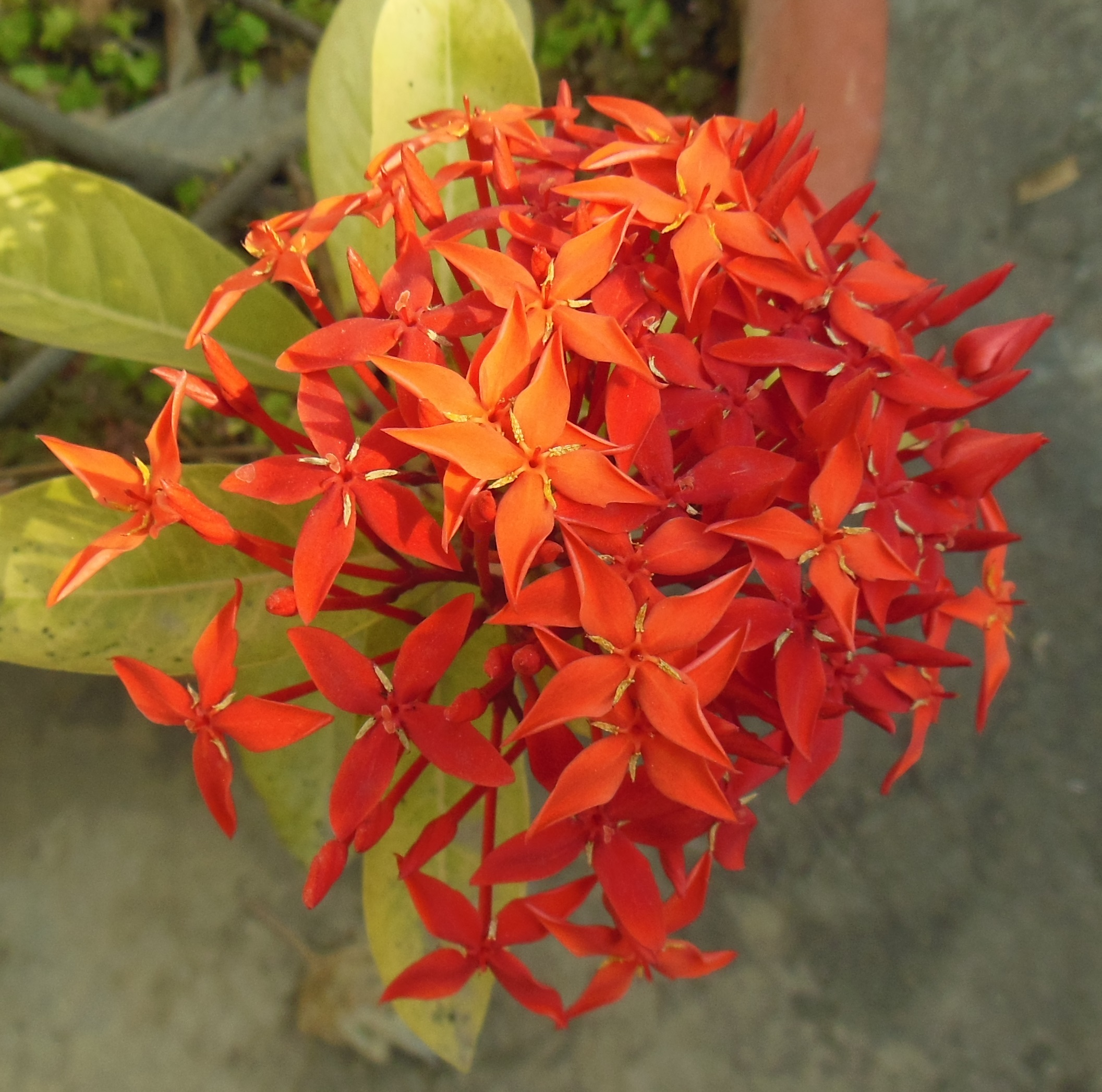

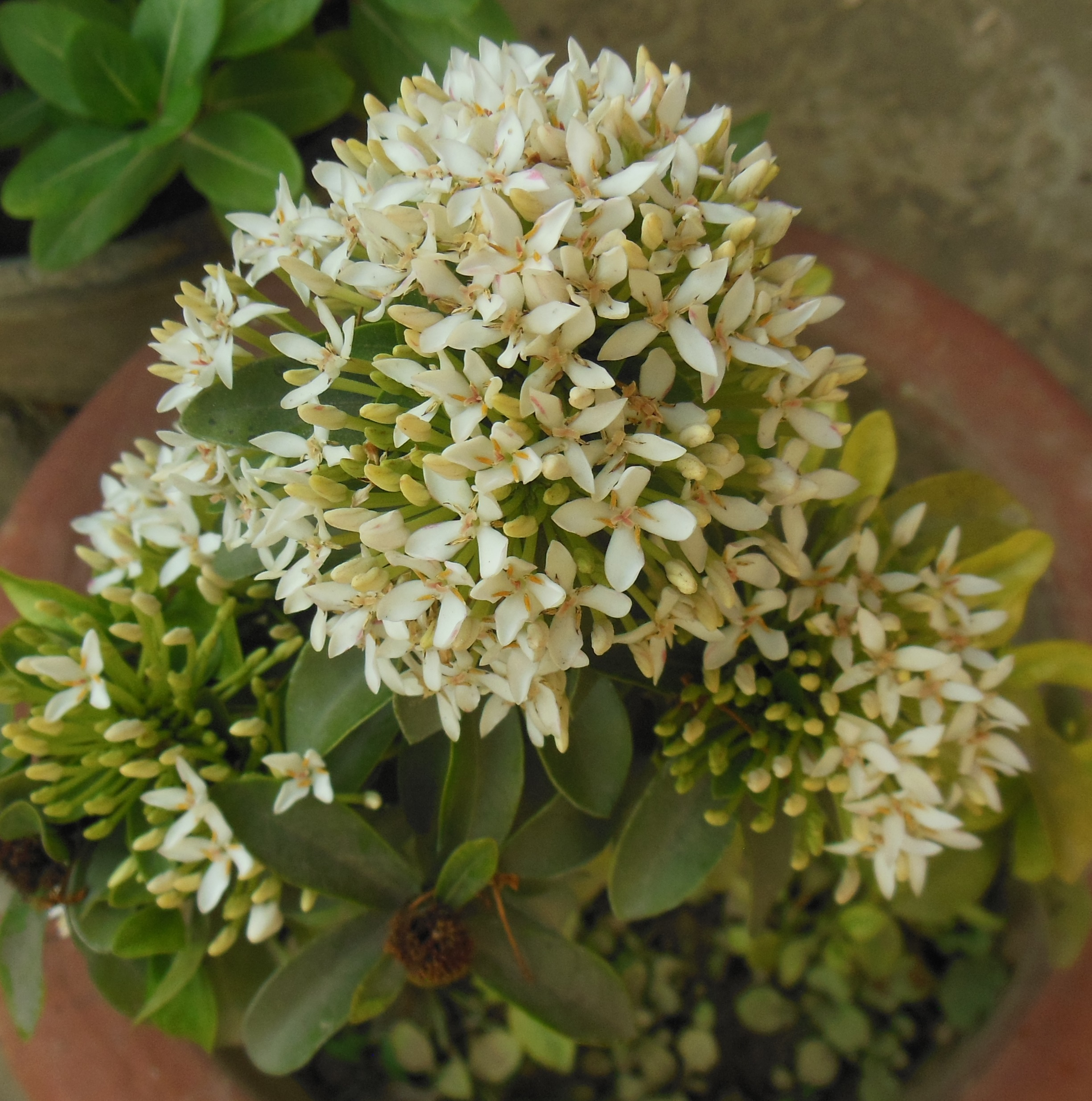

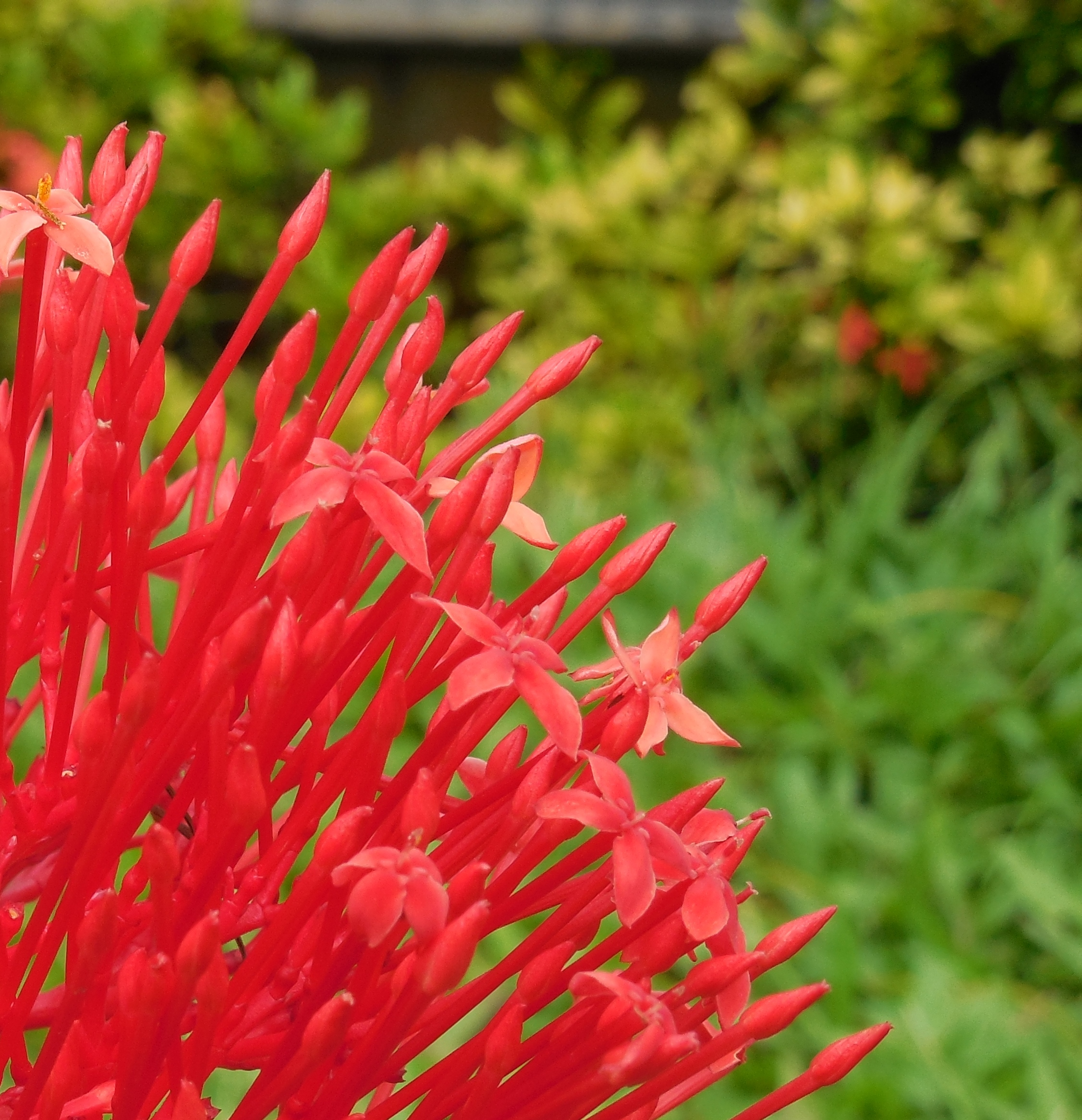

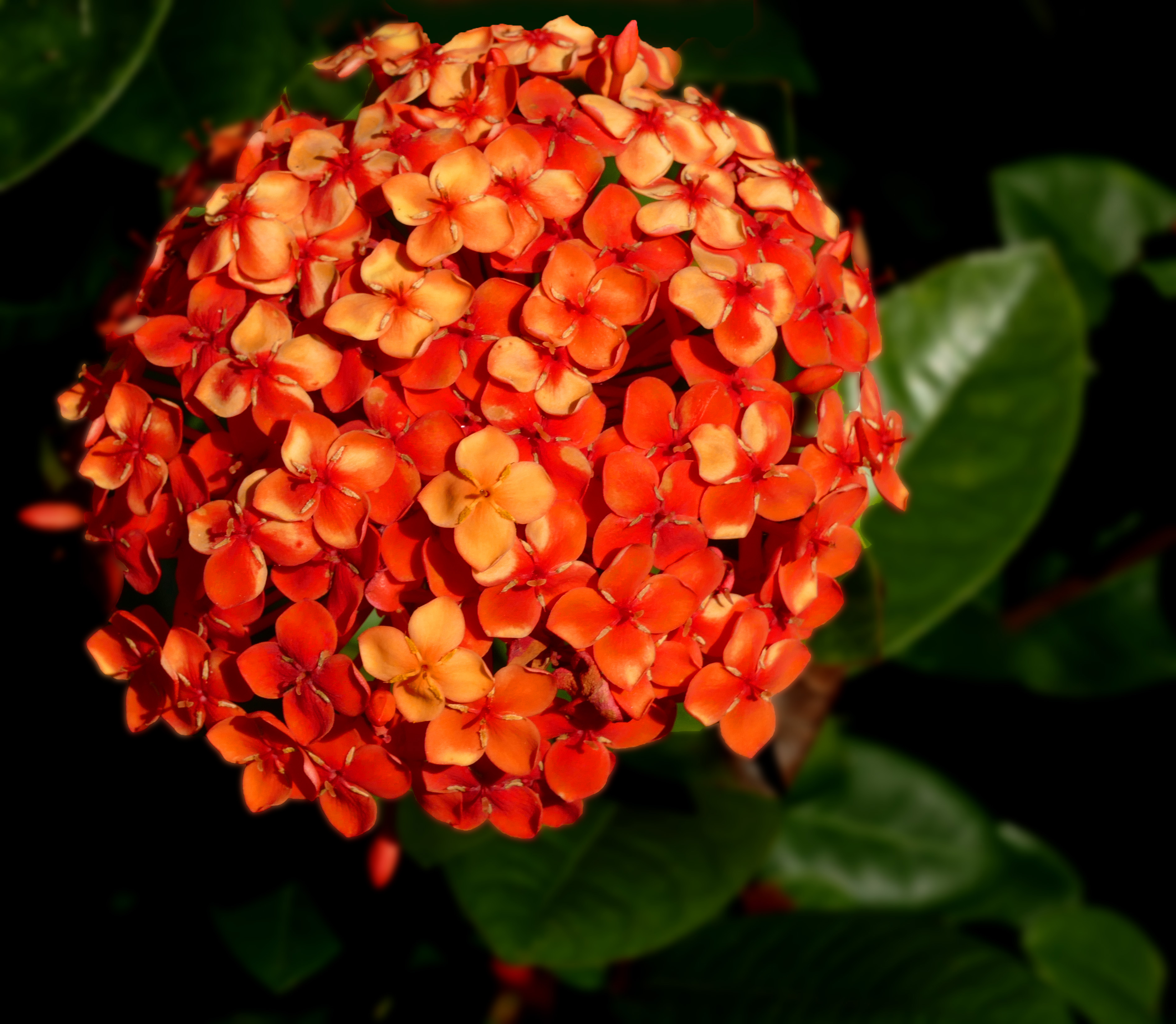

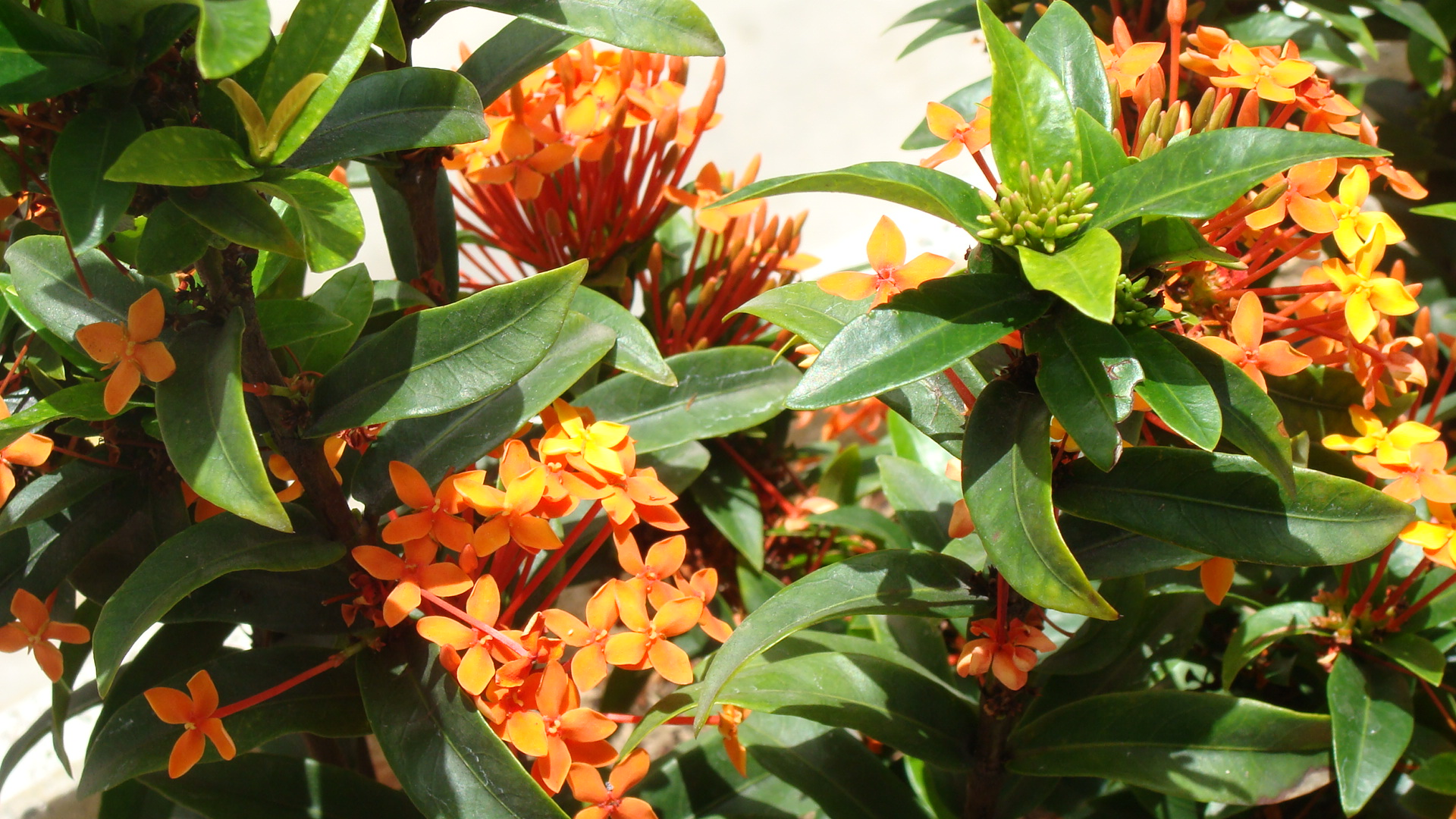

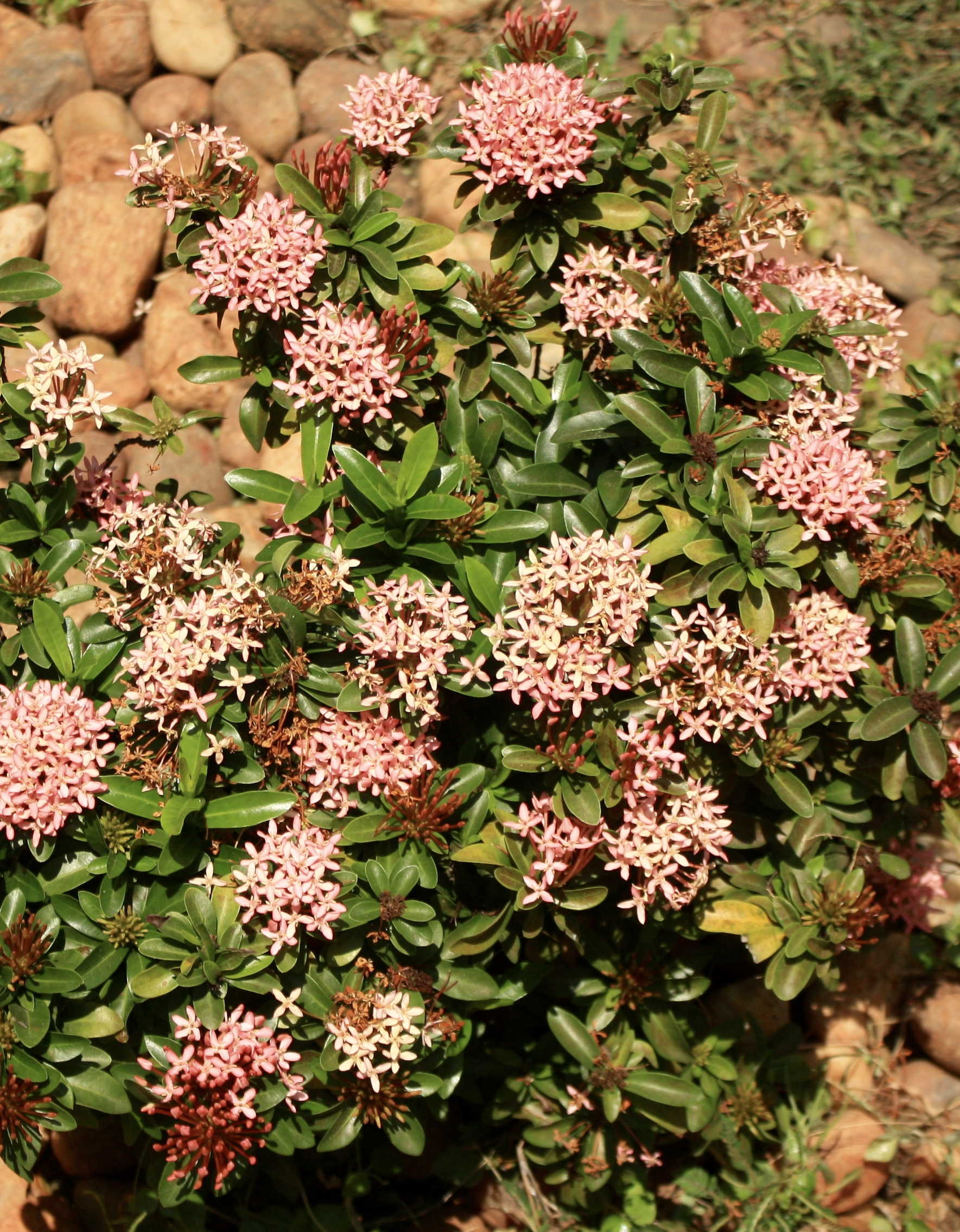

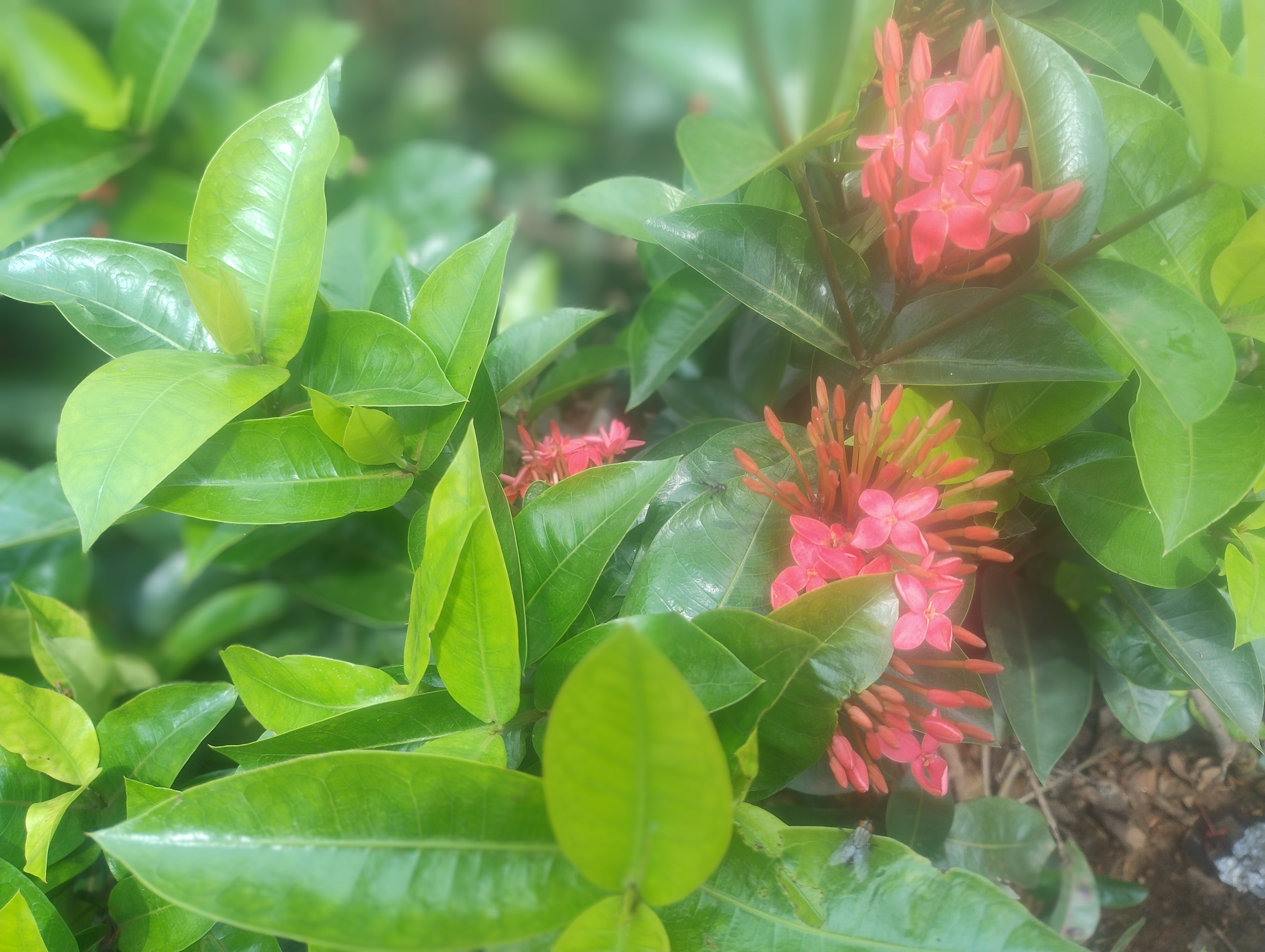
