= Betulinic acid =

Names
- IUPAC name 3β-Hydroxylup-20(29)-en-28-oic acid
- Systematic IUPAC name (1R,3aS,5aR,5bR,7aR,9S,11aR,11bR,13aR,13bR)-9-Hydroxy-5a,5b,8,8,11a-pentamethyl-1-(prop-1-en-1-yl)icosahydro-3aH-cyclopenta[a]chrysene-3a-carboxylic acid
- Other names Betulic acid Mairin

Identifiers
CAS Number	472-15-1
3D model (JSmol)	Interactive image
ChEBI	CHEBI:3087
ChEMBL	ChEMBL269277
ChemSpider	58496
ECHA InfoCard	100.006.773
EC Number	207-448-8
IUPHAR/BPS	3945
PubChem CID	64971
UNII	4G6A18707N
- InChI: InChI=1S/C30H48O3/c1-18(2)19-10-15-30(25(32)33)17-16-28(6)20(24(19)30)8-9-22-27(5)13-12-23(31)26(3,4)21(27)11-14-29(22,28)7/h19-24,31H,1,8-17H2,2-7H3,(H,32,33)/t19-,20+,21-,22+,23-,24+,27-,28+,29+,30-/m0/s1 Key: QGJZLNKBHJESQX-FZFNOLFKSA-N; InChI=1/C30H48O3/c1-18(2)19-10-15-30(25(32)33)17-16-28(6)20(24(19)30)8-9-22-27(5)13-12-23(31)26(3,4)21(27)11-14-29(22,28)7/h19-24,31H,1,8-17H2,2-7H3,(H,32,33)/t19-,20+,21-,22+,23-,24+,27-,28+,29+,30-/m0/s1 Key: QGJZLNKBHJESQX-FZFNOLFKBI
- SMILES: O=C(O)[C@@]54[C@@H]([C@@H]3[C@@]([C@]1([C@@H]([C@]2(C)[C@@H](CC1)C(C)(C)[C@@H](O)CC2)CC3)C)(C)CC4)[C@H](C(=C)C)CC5

Properties
Chemical formula	C_{30}H_{48}O_{3}
Molar mass	456.711 g·mol^{−1}
Melting point	316 to 318 °C (601 to 604 °F; 589 to 591 K)
- Except where otherwise noted, data are given for materials in their standard state (at 25 °C [77 °F], 100 kPa). verify (what is ?) Infobox references

Betulinic acid is a naturally occurring pentacyclic triterpenoid which has antiretroviral, antimalarial, and anti-inflammatory properties, as well as a more recently discovered potential as an anticancer agent, by inhibition of topoisomerase. It is found in the bark of several species of plants, principally the white birch (Betula pubescens) from which it gets its name, same as the bracket fungus Fomitopsis betulina, but also the ber tree (Ziziphus mauritiana), selfheal (Prunella vulgaris), the tropical carnivorous plants Triphyophyllum peltatum and Ancistrocladus heyneanus, Diospyros leucomelas, a member of the persimmon family, Tetracera boiviniana, the jambul (Syzygium formosanum), flowering quince (Pseudocydonia sinensis, former Chaenomeles sinensis KOEHNE), rosemary, and Pulsatilla chinensis.

== Antitumor activity ==
In 1995, betulinic acid was reported as a selective inhibitor of human melanoma. Then it was demonstrated to induce apoptosis in human neuroblastoma in vitro and in vivo in model systems. At one time, it was undergoing drug development with assistance from the Rapid Access to Intervention Development program of the National Cancer Institute.Betulinic acid was also active in vitro against neuroectodermal (neuroblastoma, medulloblastoma, Ewing's sarcoma) malignant brain tumors, ovarian carcinoma, human leukemia HL-60 cells, and malignant head and neck squamous cell carcinoma SCC25 and SCC9 cell lines. In contrast, epithelial tumors, such as breast, colon, small cell lung and renal cell carcinomas, as well as T-cell leukemia cells, were completely unresponsive to treatment with betulinic acid.

The effects of betulinic acid as an anticancer agent in breast cancer is found to be cannabinoid receptor dependent. Betulinic acid behaves as a CB_{1} antagonist and CB_{2} agonist.

== Mode of action ==
Regarding the mode of action of betulinic acid, little is known about its antiproliferative and apoptosis-inducing mechanisms. In neuroectodermal tumor cells, betulinic acid–induced apoptosis is accompanied by caspase activation, mitochondrial membrane alterations and DNA fragmentation. Caspases are produced as inactive proenzymes, which are proteolytically processed to their active forms. These proteases can cooperate in proteolytic cascades, in which caspases activate themselves and each other. The initiation of the caspases cascade may lead to the activation of endonucleases such as caspase-activated DNAase (CAD). After activation, CAD contributes to DNA degradation. Betulinic acid induces apoptosis by direct effects on mitochondria, leading to cytochrome c release, which in turn regulates the "downstream" caspase activation. Betulinic acid bypasses resistance to CD95 and doxorubicin-mediated apoptosis, due to different molecular mechanism of betulinic acid-induced apoptosis.

The role of p53 in betulinic acid-induced apoptosis is controversial. Fulda suggested a p53-independent mechanism of the apoptosis, based on no accumulation of wild-type p53 detected upon treatment with the betulinic acid, whereas wild-type p53 protein strongly increased after treatment with doxorubicin. The suggestion is supported by study of Raisova. Alternatively, Rieber suggested betulinic acid exerts its inhibitory effect on human metastatic melanoma partly by increasing p53.

The study also demonstrated preferential apoptotic effect of betulinic acid on C8161 metastatic melanoma cells, with greater DNA fragmentation and growth arrest and earlier loss of viability than their nonmetastatic C8161/neo 6.3 counterpart. Comparing betulinic acid with other treatment modes, Zuco demonstrated it was less than 10% as potent as doxorubicin and showed an in vitro antiproliferative activity against melanoma and nonmelanoma cell lines, including those resistant to doxorubicin. On the human normal dermatoblast cell line, betulinic acid was one-half to one-fifth as toxic as doxorubicin. The ability of betulinic acid to induce two different effects (cytotoxic and cytostatic) on two clones derived from the same human melanoma metastasis suggests the development of clones resistant to this agent will be more unlikely, than that to conventional cytotoxic drugs. Moreover, in spite of the lower potency compared with doxorubicin, betulinic acid seems to be selective for tumor cells with minimal toxicity against normal cells. The effect of betulinic acid on melanoma cell lines is stronger than its growth-inhibitory effect on primary melanocytes. A study of a combination of betulinic acid with γ-irradiation showed clearly additive effects, and indicated they differ in their modes of action.

C-3 esterification of betulinic acid led to the discovery of bevirimat, an HIV-1 maturation inhibitor patented by Rhone-Poulenc (now Sanofi-Aventis). The clinical development, however, was stopped due to poor pharmacodynamic properties.

== Use in cosmetics ==
There has been great emphasis on the use of betulinic acid as an antioxidative additive. Creams containing betulinic acid have been proven to help against highly reactive radicals that might cause skin DNA damage. Furthermore, betulinic acid was able to counteract the effects of ionizing radiation like UV. This makes betulinic acid a great additive for sunscreems and sunblocks and also creams for anti-aging purposes.

== Biosynthesis ==
Saccharomyces cerevisiae has been engineered to produce betulinic acid from the mevalonate pathway, with squalene 2,3-epoxide as an intermediate. Acetyl-CoA is converted to squalene through use of the 3-hydroxyl-3-methylglutaryl-CoA reductase (HMGR) and the bifunctional farnesyl-diphosphate farnesyltransferase and squalene synthase (ERG9) and oxidation of NADPH to NADP^{+}. This is then further oxygenated by the squalene monooxygenase (ERG1) to squalene 2,3-epoxide. This is cyclized to lupeol by the Arabidopsis thaliana lupeol synthase (AtLUP1). Finally, lupeol is converted to betulinic acid through the Catharanthus roseus P450 monooxygenase (CrAO) with the oxidation of NADPH to NADP^{+}.

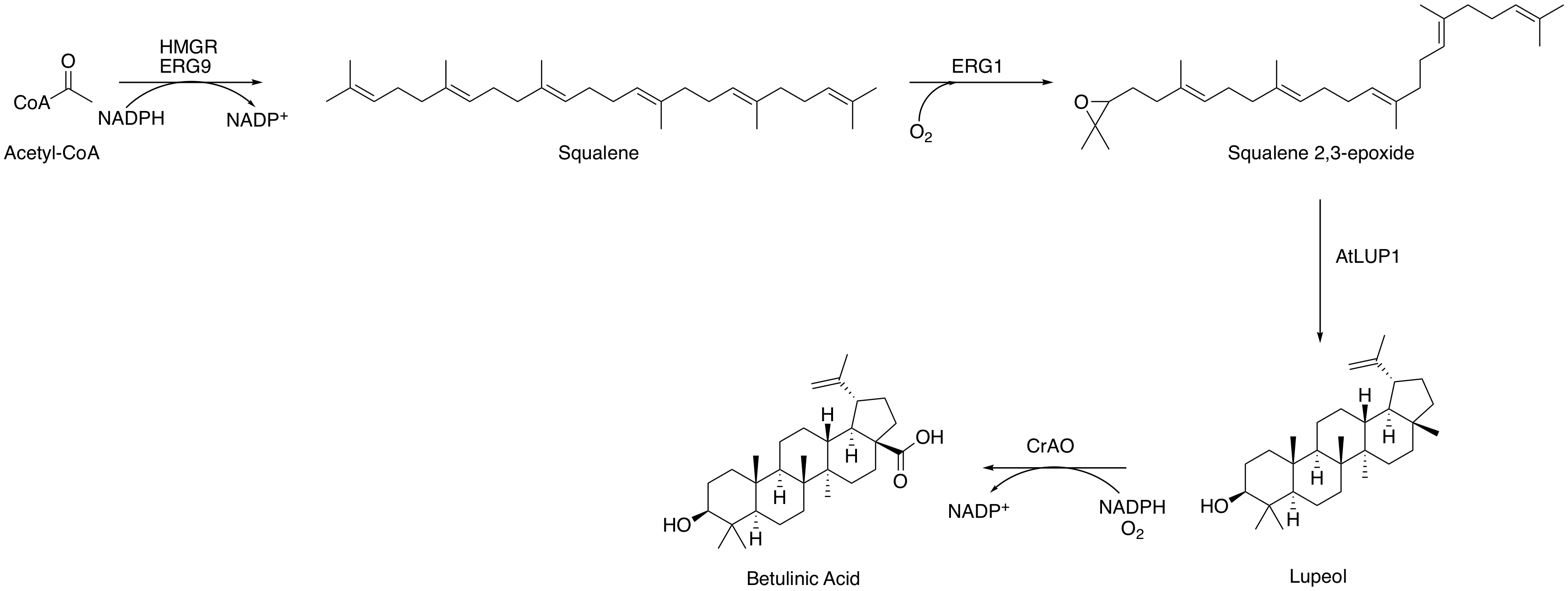
Biosynthetic pathway of betulinic acid, with all of the enzymes, structures, and cofactors as described by Li et al. in "Modulating betulinic acid production in Saccharomyces cerevisiae by managing the intracellular supplies of the co-factor NADPH and oxygen".

== Anticancer derivatives ==
A major inconvenience for the future clinical development of betulinic acid and analogues resides in their poor solubility in aqueous media such as blood serum and polar solvents used for bioassays. To circumvent this problem of hydrosolubility and to enhance pharmacological properties, many derivatives were synthesized and evaluated for cytotoxic activity. One study showed C-20 modifications involve the loss of cytotoxicity. Another study demonstrated the importance of the presence of the -COOH group, since compounds substituted at this position, such as lupeol and methyl betulinate, were less active on human melanoma than betulinic acid. Moreover, some C-28 amino acids and C-3 phthalates derivatives exhibited higher cytotoxic activity against cancer cell lines with improved selective toxicity and water solubility. Chatterjee et al. obtained the 28-O-β-D-glucopyranoside of betulinic acid by microbial transformation with Cunninghamella species, while Baglin et al. obtained it by organic synthesis. This glucoside did not exhibit any significant in vitro activity on human melanoma (MEL-2) and human colorectal adenocarcinoma (HT-29) cell lines, which confirms the importance of the carboxylic acid function to preserve the cytotoxicity. Recently, Gauthier et al. synthesized a series of 3-O-glycosides of betulinic acid which exhibited a strongly potent in vitro anticancer activity against human cancer cell lines.

== See also ==
- Oleanolic acid
- Ursolic acid
- Moronic acid
