= Momordin =

Momordin may be one of two classes of chemicals found in certain plants:

- Momordin (saponin), a derivative of the triterpenoid oleanic acid
- Momordin (protein), an enzymatic protein that inactivates ribosomes

== See also ==
- Momordica, a plant genus that yields momordins of both kinds.
