= Eugenia acutisepala =

Eugenia acutisepala can refer to the following plant species:

- Eugenia acutisepala Proctor, a synonym of Eugenia acrisepala Govaerts
- Eugenia acutisepala Hayata, a synonym of Syzygium formosanum (Hayata) K.Mori
