= Fipravirimat =

HIV/AIDS treatment experimental drug

Clinical data
- Other names: GSK3640254

Legal status
- Legal status: Investigational

Identifiers
- IUPAC name: (1R)-4-[(1R,3aS,5aR,5bR,7aR,11aS,11bR,13aR,13bR)-3a-[2-(1,1-dioxo-1,4-thiazinan-4-yl)ethylamino]-5a,5b,8,8,11a-pentamethyl-1-prop-1-en-2-yl-1,2,3,4,5,6,7,7a,11,11b,12,13,13a,13b-tetradecahydrocyclopenta[a]chrysen-9-yl]-1-(fluoromethyl)cyclohex-3-ene-1-carboxylic acid
- CAS Number: 1818867-24-1
- PubChem CID: 118435805
- UNII: M5FP5REG5Q
- KEGG: D12523

Chemical and physical data
- Formula: C_{43}H_{67}FN_{2}O_{4}S
- Molar mass: 727.08 g·mol^{−1}
- 3D model (JSmol): Interactive image
- SMILES: CC(=C)[C@@H]1CC[C@]2([C@H]1[C@H]3CC[C@H]4[C@]([C@@]3(CC2)C)(CC[C@@H]5[C@@]4(CC=C(C5(C)C)C6=CC[C@@](CC6)(CF)C(=O)O)C)C)NCCN7CCS(=O)(=O)CC7
- InChI: InChI=1S/C43H67FN2O4S/c1-29(2)31-12-19-43(45-22-23-46-24-26-51(49,50)27-25-46)21-20-40(6)33(36(31)43)8-9-35-39(5)15-13-32(38(3,4)34(39)14-16-41(35,40)7)30-10-17-42(28-44,18-11-30)37(47)48/h10,13,31,33-36,45H,1,8-9,11-12,14-28H2,2-7H3,(H,47,48)/t31-,33+,34-,35+,36+,39-,40+,41+,42+,43-/m0/s1; Key:YFSNREBZTKMFEB-DHGHKPCRSA-N

Fipravirimat is an experimental drug for the treatment of HIV/AIDS. It belongs to a class of drugs known as maturation inhibitors.

Fipravirimat was being developed by ViiV Healthcare, but development was stopped in 2023.

== See also ==
- BMS-955176
