= BMS-955176 =

Chemical compound

Legal status
- Legal status: Investigational

Identifiers
- CAS Number: 1392312-45-6
- ChemSpider: 58922159
- UNII: 4CA9IAU7RJ
- CompTox Dashboard (EPA): DTXSID401336145

Chemical and physical data
- Formula: C_{42}H_{62}N_{2}O_{4}S
- Molar mass: 691.03 g·mol^{−1}
- 3D model (JSmol): Interactive image
- SMILES: CC(=C)[C@@H]1CC[C@]2([C@H]1[C@H]3CC[C@H]4[C@]([C@@]3(CC2)C)(CC[C@@H]5[C@@]4(CC=C(C5(C)C)c6ccc(cc6)C(=O)O)C)C)NCCN7CCS(=O)(=O)CC7
- InChI: InChI=1S/C42H62N2O4S/c1-28(2)31-14-19-42(43-22-23-44-24-26-49(47,48)27-25-44)21-20-40(6)33(36(31)42)12-13-35-39(5)17-15-32(29-8-10-30(11-9-29)37(45)46)38(3,4)34(39)16-18-41(35,40)7/h8-11,15,31,33-36,43H,1,12-14,16-27H2,2-7H3,(H,45,46)/t31-,33+,34-,35+,36+,39-,40+,41+,42-/m0/s1; Key:XDMUFNNPLXHNKA-ZTESCHFWSA-N

BMS-955176 is an experimental second generation HIV maturation inhibitor under development by Bristol-Myers Squibb for use in the treatment of HIV infection. By blocking the maturation of the virus, it prevents viral reproduction in host CD4+ T cells. First generation maturation inhibitors such as bevirimat were ineffective against some naturally occurring changes (polymorphisms) in the Gag protease polyprotein; BMS-955176 has been designed to better tolerate gag polymorphisms.

== Studies ==
Results of a phase 2a trial of BMS-955176 was reported at the 2015 Conference on Retroviruses and Opportunistic Infections (CROI). Investigators concluded that the drug was well tolerated and effective against HIV, including strains with gag polymorphisms.

It appears that development of BMS-955176 has been terminated.

== See also ==
- Fipravirimat
