= Momordin (protein) =

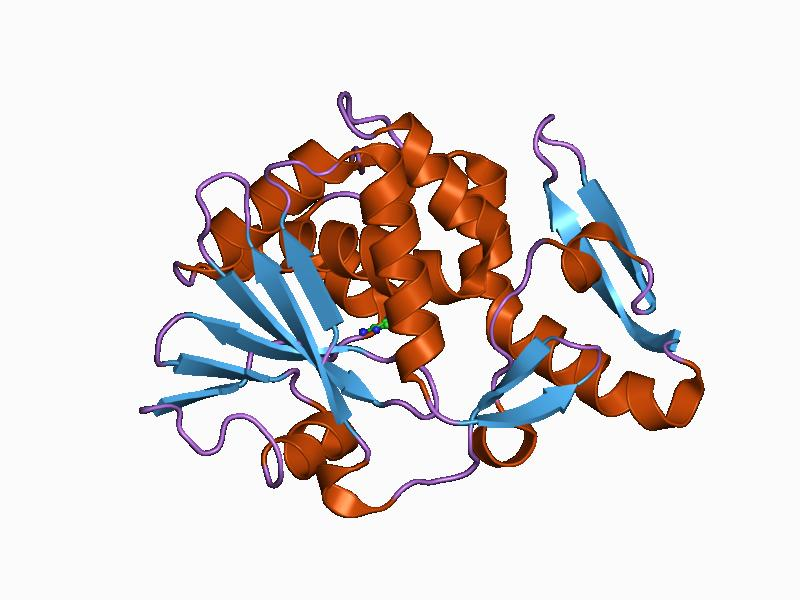
α-Momorcharin (1aha EBI).

Momordin or α-momorcharin is one of several related proteins isolated from several plants of the genus Momordica, which includes the bitter melon (M. charantia) and the balsam apple (M. balsamina).

These enzymes are potent inhibitor of protein synthesis in eukaryotes by inactivating the ribosomes. However its cytotoxic activity is limited because it is not taken up by the cells; it has to be chemically modified to do so.

There are several variants, including momordin II (from M. balsamina) and momordin-a (from M. charantia).

== See also ==
- Momordin (saponin), an unrelated compound (a saponin of the triterpenoid oleanic acid).
