= Ursolic acid =

Pentacyclic chemical compound found in fruits

Names
- IUPAC name 3β-Hydroxyurs-12-en-28-oic acid
- Systematic IUPAC name (1S,2R,4aS,6aS,6bR,8aR,10S,12aR,12bR,14bS)-10-Hydroxy-1,2,6a,6b,9,9,12a-heptamethyl-1,3,4,5,6,6a,6b,7,8,8a,9,10,11,12,12a,12b,13,14b-octadecahydropicene-4a(2H)-carboxylic acid
- Other names Prunol, Malol, β-Ursolic acid, NSC4060, CCRIS 7123, TOS-BB-0966

Identifiers
CAS Number	77-52-1
3D model (JSmol)	Interactive image
ChEBI	CHEBI:9908
ChEMBL	ChEMBL169
ChemSpider	58472
ECHA InfoCard	100.000.941
PubChem CID	64945
UNII	P3M2575F3F
CompTox Dashboard (EPA)	DTXSID70883221
- InChI: InChI=1S/C30H48O3/c1-18-10-15-30(25(32)33)17-16-28(6)20(24(30)19(18)2)8-9-22-27(5)13-12-23(31)26(3,4)21(27)11-14-29(22,28)7/h8,18-19,21-24,31H,9-17H2,1-7H3,(H,32,33)/t18-,19+,21+,22-,23+,24+,27+,28-,29-,30+/m1/s1 Key: WCGUUGGRBIKTOS-GPOJBZKASA-N; InChI=1/C30H48O3/c1-18-10-15-30(25(32)33)17-16-28(6)20(24(30)19(18)2)8-9-22-27(5)13-12-23(31)26(3,4)21(27)11-14-29(22,28)7/h8,18-19,21-24,31H,9-17H2,1-7H3,(H,32,33)/t18-,19+,21+,22-,23+,24+,27+,28-,29-,30+/m1/s1 Key: WCGUUGGRBIKTOS-GPOJBZKABB
- SMILES: O=C(O)[C@@]54[C@H](/C3=C/C[C@H]1[C@](CC[C@@H]2[C@]1(C)CC[C@H](O)C2(C)C)(C)[C@]3(C)CC4)[C@@H](C)[C@H](C)CC5

Properties
Chemical formula	C_{30}H_{48}O_{3}
Molar mass	456.711 g·mol^{−1}
Melting point	285 to 288 °C (545 to 550 °F; 558 to 561 K)
- Except where otherwise noted, data are given for materials in their standard state (at 25 °C [77 °F], 100 kPa). verify (what is ?) Infobox references

Ursolic acid (sometimes referred to as urson, prunol, malol, or 3β-hydroxyurs-12-en-28-oic acid), is a pentacyclic triterpenoid identified in the epicuticular waxes of apples as early as 1920 and widely found in the peels of fruits, as well as in herbs and spices like rosemary and thyme. Betulinic and oleanic acids are both constitutional isomers of ursolic acid.

== Natural occurrence ==
Ursolic acid is present in many plants, such as Mirabilis jalapa, as well as in many fruits and herbs used in daily life (e.g. apples, plantago major, basil and holy basil, bilberries, cranberries, elder flower, peppermint, rosemary, lavender, oregano, thyme, hawthorn, and prunes). Apple peels contain large quantities of ursolic acid and related compounds.

== Potential biochemical effects ==
A number of potential biochemical effects of ursolic acid have been investigated, but there has been no clinical study demonstrating benefits to human health. In vitro, ursolic acid inhibits the proliferation of various cancer cell types by inhibiting the STAT3 activation pathway, and may also decrease proliferation of cancer cells and induce apoptosis. Ursolic acid has also been shown to inhibit JNK expression and IL-2 activation of JURKAT leukemic T Cells leading to the reduction in proliferation and T cell activation. Ursolic acid is a weak aromatase inhibitor (IC_{50} = 32 μM), and has been shown to increase the amount of muscle and brown fat and decrease white fat obesity and associated conditions when added to diets fed to mice. Under physiological concentrations, ursolic acid also induces eryptosis (the apoptosis-like suicidal cell death in defective red blood cells). It has been found to reduce muscle atrophy and to stimulate muscular growth in mice, also shows a potential cardioprotection.

In mice, ursolic acid induces neural regeneration after sciatic nerve injuries and recently found to have COVID preventative capabilities. More research in this recent finding is underway. In mice with chronic multiple sclerosis, ursolic acid has reduced further damage to neurons and helped rebuild the protective sheaths covering neurons, apparently by suppressing Th17 immune cells and activating precursor cells that mature into myelin-sheath-making cells, called oligodendrocytes. Ursolic acid improves domoic acid-induced cognitive deficits in mice. Ursolic acid improves high fat diet-induced cognitive impairments by blocking endoplasmic reticulum stress and IκB kinase β/nuclear factor-κB-mediated inflammatory pathways in mice. Ursolic acid attenuates lipopolysaccharide-induced cognitive deficits in mouse brain through suppressing p38/NF-κB mediated inflammatory pathways. Ursolic acid ameliorates cognition deficits and attenuates oxidative damage in the brain of senescent mice induced by D-galactose. Ursolic acid enhances mouse liver regeneration after partial hepatectomy. Ursolic acid enhances the cellular immune system and pancreatic beta-cell function in streptozotocin-induced diabetic mice fed a high-fat diet. Ursolic acid increased skeletal muscle mass, as well as grip strength and exercise capacity, improved endurance, reduced the expression of the genes involved in the development of muscle atrophy, and decreased indicators of accumulated fatigue and exercise-induced stress.

In rats, ursolic acid ameliorated high-fat diet-induced hepatic steatosis and improved metabolic disorders in high-fat diet-induced metabolic dysfunction–associated steatotic liver disease.

== Uses ==
Ursolic acid can be found in plants that are used for cosmetics additives. It can serve as a starting material for synthesis of more potent bioactive derivatives, such as experimental antitumor agents.

== See also ==
- Betulinic acid
- Moronic acid
- Oleanolic acid
- Corosolic acid
