= Hydroxymethylglutaryl-CoA reductase (NADPH) =

Class of enzymes

hydroxymethylglutaryl-CoA reductase (NADPH)
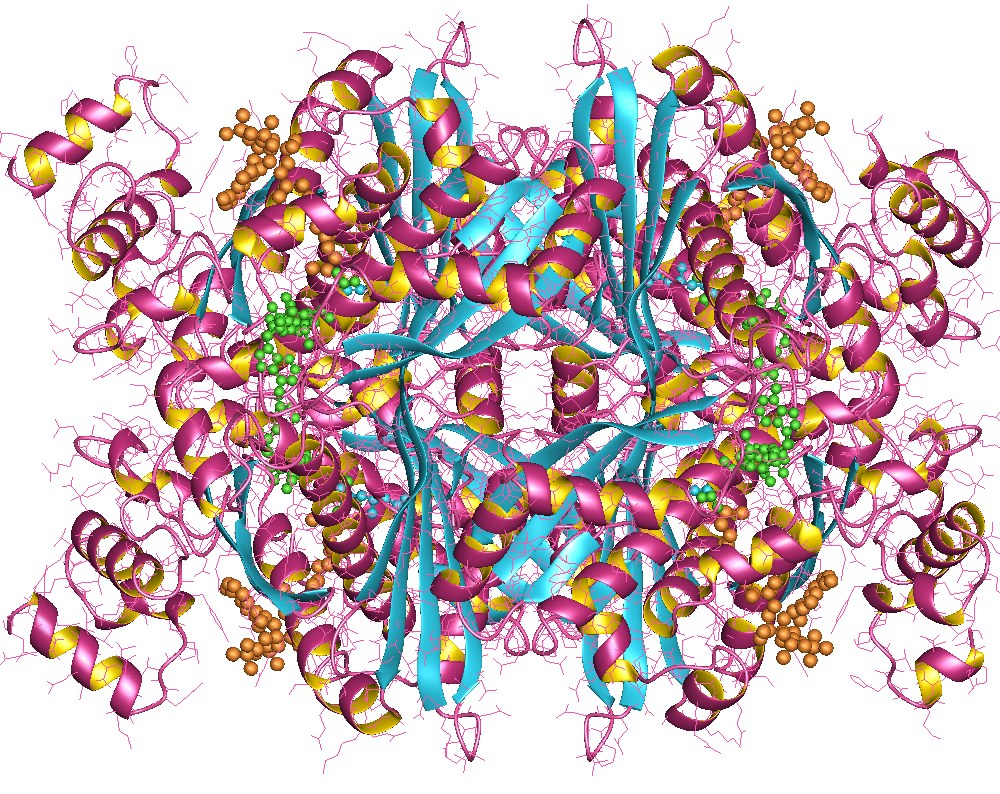
- HMG-CoA reductase tetramer, Human

Identifiers
- EC no.: 1.1.1.34
- CAS no.: 9028-35-7

Databases
- BRENDA: enzyme data
- ExPASy: NiceZyme view
- KEGG: enzyme entry
- MetaCyc: metabolic pathway
- Rhea: reactions
- PDB structures: RCSB PDB PDBe PDBsum
- Gene Ontology: AmiGO / QuickGO
Search
- PMC: articles
- PubMed: articles
- NCBI: proteins

In enzymology, a hydroxymethylglutaryl-CoA reductase (NADPH) (EC 1.1.1.34) is an enzyme that catalyzes the chemical reaction

(R)-mevalonate
+ CoA + 2 NADP^{+}
2 H^{+}
2 H^{+}
(S)-3-hydroxy-3-methylglutaryl-CoA
+ 2 NADPH

The three substrates of this enzyme are (R)-mevalonate, coenzyme A (CoA), and oxidised nicotinamide adenine dinucleotide phosphate (NADP^{+}). Its products are (S)-3-hydroxy-3-methylglutaryl-CoA, reduced NADPH, and two protons.

This enzyme belongs to the family of oxidoreductases, to be specific those acting on the CH-OH group of donor with NAD^{+} or NADP^{+} as acceptor. This enzyme participates in biosynthesis of steroids including cholesterol. The statin class of anticholesterol drugs act through inhibiting this enzyme.

== Nomenclature ==
The systematic name of this enzyme class is (R)-mevalonate:NADP^{+} oxidoreductase (CoA-acylating). Other names in common use include:

- hydroxymethylglutaryl coenzyme A reductase (reduced nicotinamide adenine dinucleotide phosphate)
- 3-hydroxy-3-methylglutaryl-CoA reductase
- β-hydroxy-β-methylglutaryl coenzyme A reductase
- hydroxymethylglutaryl CoA reductase (NADPH)
- S-3-hydroxy-3-methylglutaryl-CoA reductase
- NADPH-hydroxymethylglutaryl-CoA reductase
- HMGCoA reductase-mevalonate:NADP-oxidoreductase (acetylating-CoA)
- 3-hydroxy-3-methylglutaryl CoA reductase (NADPH)
- hydroxymethylglutaryl-CoA reductase (NADPH_{2}).

== Structural studies ==
As of late 2007, 12 structures have been solved for this class of enzymes, with PDB accession codes PDB: 1DQ8, PDB: 1DQ9, PDB: 1DQA, PDB: 1HW8, PDB: 1HW9, PDB: 1HWI, PDB: 1HWJ, PDB: 1HWK, PDB: 1HWL, PDB: 2Q1L, PDB: 2Q6B, and PDB: 2Q6C.
