= Ganodermanontriol =

Names
- IUPAC name (24S,25R)-24,25,26-Trihydroxylanosta-7,9(11)-dien-3-one
- Systematic IUPAC name (1R,3aR,5aR,9aS,11aR)-3a,5,5,9a,11a-Pentamethyl-1-[(2R,5S,6R)-5,6,7-trihydroxy-6-methylheptan-2-yl]-1,2,3,3a,5,5a,6,8,9,9a,11,11a-dodecahydro-7H-cyclopenta[a]phenanthren-7-one

Identifiers
CAS Number	106518-63-2
3D model (JSmol)	Interactive image
ChemSpider	19970448
PubChem CID	3001811
UNII	6NB33MKR8F
CompTox Dashboard (EPA)	DTXSID10910025
- InChI: InChI=1S/C30H48O4/c1-19(8-11-25(33)30(7,34)18-31)20-12-16-29(6)22-9-10-23-26(2,3)24(32)14-15-27(23,4)21(22)13-17-28(20,29)5/h9,13,19-20,23,25,31,33-34H,8,10-12,14-18H2,1-7H3/t19-,20-,23+,25+,27-,28-,29+,30-/m1/s1 Key: KASALCUNLBTNAA-LIPCCPSCSA-N
- SMILES: C[C@@H]([C@@H]1[C@@]2([C@](C3=CC[C@@H]4[C@@](C3=CC2)(CCC(=O)[C@]4(C)C)C)(CC1)C)C)CC[C@H](O)[C@](O)(CO)C

Properties
Chemical formula	C_{30}H_{48}O_{4}
Molar mass	472.710 g·mol^{−1}
- Except where otherwise noted, data are given for materials in their standard state (at 25 °C [77 °F], 100 kPa). Infobox references

Ganodermanontriol is a lanostanoid triterpene isolated from Ganoderma lucidum.
