= Momordin (saponin) =

Momordin is one of several saponins derived from oleanolic acid, a triterpenoid. These chemical compounds are found in some plants of the genus Momordica, which includes the bitter melon (M. charantia) and the balsam apple (M. balsamina), as well as in other Asian herbal medicine plants such as Kochia scoparia and Ampelopsis radix.

Momordins include:

- Momordin I, oleanolic acid 3-O-α-L-arabinopyranosyl(1→3)-β-D-glucuronopyranoside. A white powder that decomposes at 235–240 °C. Found in the root of Momordica cochinchinensis where it constitutes 10% of the dried methanol extract.
- Momordin Ia, from M. cochinchinensis.
- Momordin Ib, from M. cochinchinensis.
- Momordin Ic or (3β)-17-carboxy-28-norolean-12-en-3-yl 3'-O-(β-D-xylopyranosyl)-β-D-glucuronide (C_{41}H_{64}O_{13}), CAS number 96990-18-0. It is obtained as colorless fine crystals that decompose at 240 °C. It inhibits gastric emptying in mice.
- Momordin Id, from M. cochinchinensis.
- Momordin Ie, CAS 96158–13–3.
- Momordin II, the 28-O-β-D-glucopyranoside of momordin I. Colorless needles, soluble in methanol, that melt at 240−245 °C. Also from M. cochinchinensis; identical to hemsloside Ma 1 from Hemsleya macrosperma and H. chinensis
- Momordin IIa, from M. cochinchinensis.
- Momordin IIb, from M. cochinchinensis.
- Momordin IIc, either the same as oleanic acid or (quinoside D)[β-D-glucopyranosyl 3-O-[β-D-xylopyranosyl-(1→3)-O-(β-D-glucopyranosyluronic acid)] oleanolate]
- Momordin IId, from M. cochinchinensis.
- Momordin IIe, CAS 96158–12–2.
- Momordin III, 3β-hydroxy-11α, 12α-epoxy-olean-28,13-olide 3-O-α-L-arabinopyranosyl(1→3)-β-D-glucuronopyranoside. Also from M. cochinchinensis.

== See also ==
- Momordin (protein), unrelated enzymes (proteins) from Momordica and other plants.
