= Moronic acid =

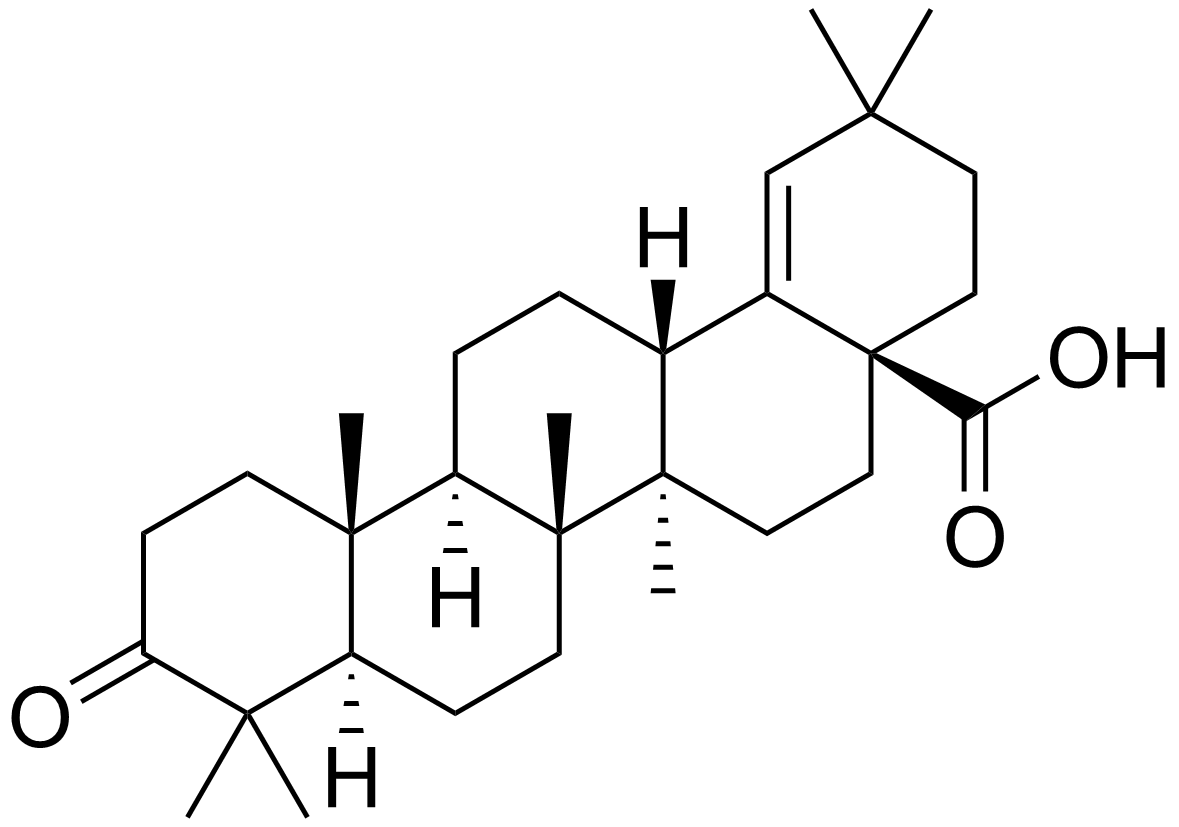

Names
- IUPAC name 3-Oxoolean-18-en-28-oic acid
- Systematic IUPAC name (4aS,6aR,6bR,8aR,12aR,12bR,14aS)-2,2,6a,6b,9,9,12a-Heptamethyl-10-oxo-3,4,5,6,6a,6b,7,8,8a,9,10,11,12,12a,12b,13,14,14a-octadecahydropicene-4a(2H)-carboxylic acid
- Other names Ambronic acid; 3-Oxoolean-18-en-28-oic acid

Identifiers
CAS Number	6713-27-5
3D model (JSmol)	Interactive image
ChEBI	CHEBI:30815
ChEMBL	ChEMBL472646
ChemSpider	429156
PubChem CID	489941
UNII	XW8W7HC4JK
CompTox Dashboard (EPA)	DTXSID30891948
- InChI: InChI=1S/C30H46O3/c1-25(2)14-16-30(24(32)33)17-15-28(6)19(20(30)18-25)8-9-22-27(5)12-11-23(31)26(3,4)21(27)10-13-29(22,28)7/h18-19,21-22H,8-17H2,1-7H3,(H,32,33)/t19-,21+,22-,27+,28-,29-,30+/m1/s1 Key: UMYJVVZWBKIXQQ-QALSDZMNSA-N; InChI=1/C30H46O3/c1-25(2)14-16-30(24(32)33)17-15-28(6)19(20(30)18-25)8-9-22-27(5)12-11-23(31)26(3,4)21(27)10-13-29(22,28)7/h18-19,21-22H,8-17H2,1-7H3,(H,32,33)/t19-,21+,22-,27+,28-,29-,30+/m1/s1 Key: UMYJVVZWBKIXQQ-QALSDZMNBW
- SMILES: O=C2C([C@@H]1CC[C@@]4([C@@H]([C@@]1(C)CC2)CC[C@@H]5/C3=C/C(C)(C)CC[C@]3(C(=O)O)CC[C@@]45C)C)(C)C

Properties
Chemical formula	C_{30}H_{46}O_{3}
Molar mass	454.695 g·mol^{−1}
- Except where otherwise noted, data are given for materials in their standard state (at 25 °C [77 °F], 100 kPa). verify (what is ?) Infobox references

Moronic acid (3-oxoolean-18-en-28-oic acid) is a natural triterpene. Moronic acid can be extracted from Rhus javanica, a sumac plant traditionally believed to hold medicinal applications. The molecule has also been extracted from mistletoe (Phoradendron reichenbachianum).

Bevirimat, a derivative of the related triterpenoid betulinic acid, is under development as an anti-HIV drug; however, moronic acid has shown better antiviral profiles in vitro than bevirimat. A particular moronic acid derivative showed potent anti-HIV activity with EC_{50} values of 0.0085 μM against NL4-3, 0.021 μM against PI-R (a multiple protease inhibitor resistant strain), and 0.13 μM against FHR-2 (an HIV strain resistant to (bevirimat). This derivative has become a new lead for clinical trials and is also active against herpes simplex virus 1.
