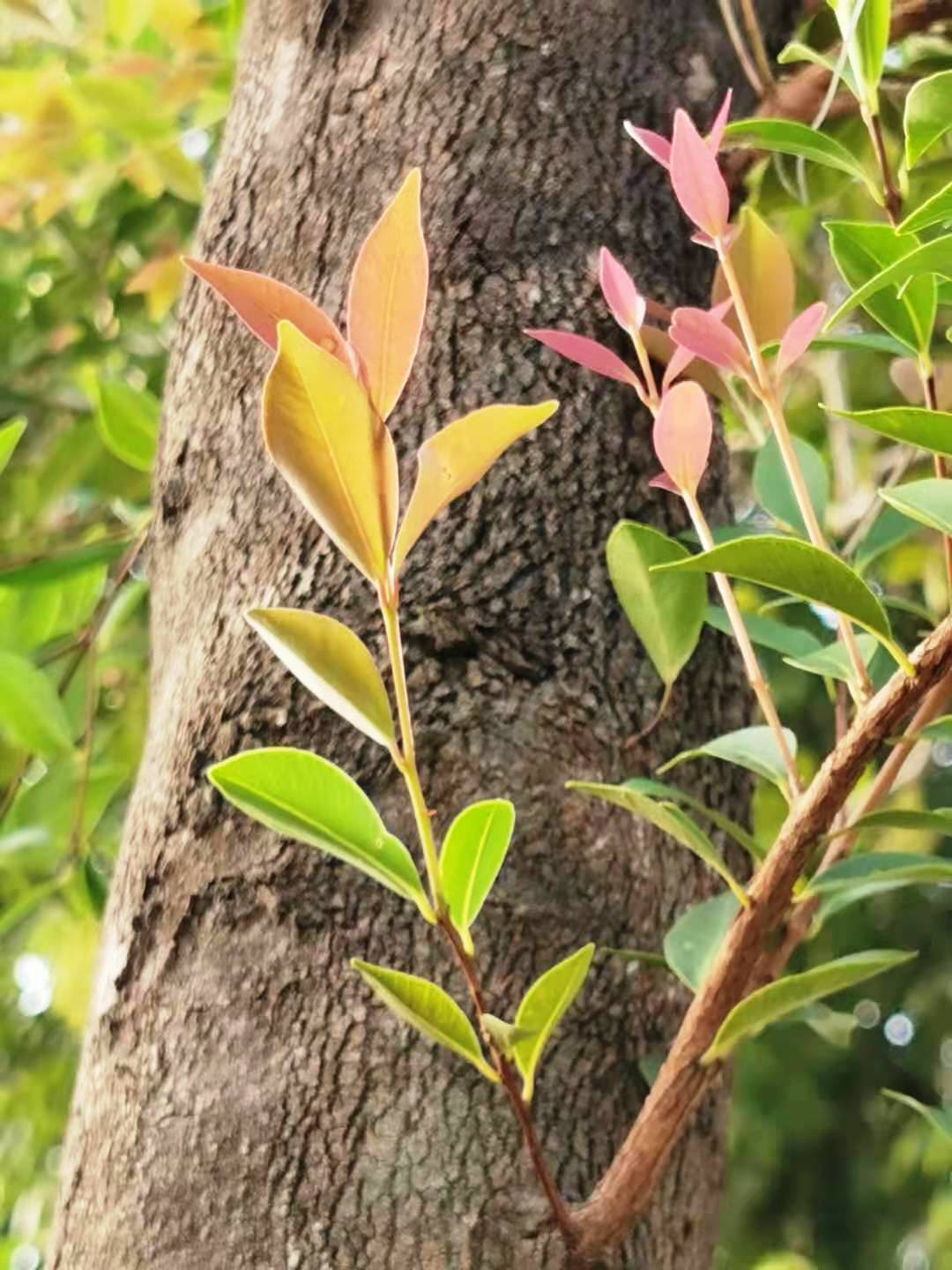
- Leaves against trunk

Scientific classification
- Kingdom: Plantae
- Clade: Tracheophytes
- Clade: Angiosperms
- Clade: Eudicots
- Clade: Rosids
- Order: Myrtales
- Family: Myrtaceae
- Genus: Syzygium
- Species: S. formosanum

Binomial name
- Syzygium formosanum (Hayata) K.Mori

Synonyms
- Eugenia acutisepala Hayata; Eugenia formosana Hayata; Syzygium acutisepalum (Hayata) Mori

= Syzygium formosanum =

- Inflorescence

Species of plant

Syzygium formosanum is a species of flowering plant in the family Myrtaceae. It is native to Taiwan. A shrub or tree 3 to 4 m (10 to 13 ft) tall, it is found in tropical seasonal rainforests at elevations from 130 to 600 m (400 to 2,000 ft).
