= Maturation inhibitor =

The maturation inhibitors are a class of antiviral drugs for the treatment of infection with HIV. They act by interfering with the maturation of the virus. Specifically, drugs in this class disrupt the final step in the processing of the HIV-1 gag protein, the cleavage of its immediate precursor by the enzyme HIV-1 protease. Unlike the class of drugs known as protease inhibitors, maturation inhibitors bind the gag protein, not the protease. This leads to the formation of noninfectious, immature virus particles, incapable of infecting other cells. No other class of drugs shares this mechanism of action, thus maturation inhibitors retain inhibitory activity against HIV infections with resistance.

There are no currently available drugs from the class; however several clinical trials have been conducted. The first maturation inhibitor to be studied in humans was bevirimat, another was MPC-9055 (vivecon). Both were developed by Myriad Genetics, which has discontinued the maturation inhibitor program in 2010. Others in development include BMS-2838232.
