= Bevirimat =

Chemical compound

Clinical data
- Other names: PA-457; 3-O-(3',3'-dimethylsuccinyl)-betulinic acid
- Routes of administration: Oral
- ATC code: none

Pharmacokinetic data
- Metabolism: Hepatic glucuronidation (UGT1A3-mediated)
- Elimination half-life: 56.3 to 69.5 hours
- Excretion: Fecal

Identifiers
- IUPAC name: (1R,3aS,5aR,5bR,7aR,9S,11aR,11bR,13aR,13bR)-9-(3-carboxy-3-methylbutanoyl)oxy-5a,5b,8,8,11a-pentamethyl-1-prop-1-en-2-yl-1,2,3,4,5,6,7,7a,9,10,11,11b,12,13,13a,13b-hexadecahydrocyclopenta[a]chrysene-3a-carboxylic acid
- CAS Number: 174022-42-5
- PubChem CID: 457928
- ChemSpider: 403003
- UNII: S125DW66N8
- ChEMBL: ChEMBL404519
- NIAID ChemDB: 028530
- CompTox Dashboard (EPA): DTXSID20169749
- ECHA InfoCard: 100.125.475

Chemical and physical data
- Formula: C_{36}H_{56}O_{6}
- Molar mass: 584.838 g·mol^{−1}
- 3D model (JSmol): Interactive image
- SMILES: CC(=C)C1CCC2(C1C3CCC4C5(CCC(C(C5CCC4(C3(CC2)C)C)(C)C)OC(=O)CC(C)(C)C(=O)O)C)C(=O)O
- InChI: InChI=1S/C36H56O6/c1-21(2)22-12-17-36(30(40)41)19-18-34(8)23(28(22)36)10-11-25-33(7)15-14-26(42-27(37)20-31(3,4)29(38)39)32(5,6)24(33)13-16-35(25,34)9/h22-26,28H,1,10-20H2,2-9H3,(H,38,39)(H,40,41)/t22-,23+,24-,25+,26-,28+,33-,34+,35+,36-/m0/s1; Key:YJEJKUQEXFSVCJ-WRFMNRASSA-N

Bevirimat (research code MPC-4326) is an anti-HIV drug derived from a betulinic acid-like compound, first isolated from Syzygium claviflorum, a Chinese herb. It is believed to inhibit HIV by a novel mechanism, so-called maturation inhibition. It is not currently U.S. Food and Drug Administration (FDA) approved. It was originally developed by the pharmaceutical company Panacos and reached Phase IIb clinical trials. Myriad Genetics announced on January 21, 2009 the acquisition of all rights to bevirimat for $7M USD. On June 8, 2010 Myriad Genetics announced that it was abandoning their HIV portfolio to focus more on cancer drug development.

== Pharmacokinetics ==
According to the only currently available study, "the mean terminal elimination half-life of bevirimat ranged from 56.3 to 69.5 hours, and the mean clearance ranged from 173.9 to 185.8 mL/hour."

== Mechanism of action ==
Like protease inhibitors, bevirimat and other maturation inhibitors interfere with protease processing of newly translated HIV polyprotein precursor, called gag. Gag is an essential structural protein of the HIV virus. Gag undergoes a chain of interactions both with itself and with other cellular and viral factors to accomplish the assembly of infectious virus particles. HIV assembly is a two-stage process involving an intermediate immature capsid that undergoes a structurally dramatic maturation to yield the infectious particle. This alteration is mediated by the viral protease, which cleaves the Gag polyprotein precursor, allowing the freed parts to reassemble to form the core of the mature virus particle. Bevirimat prevents this viral replication by specifically inhibiting cleavage of the capsid protein (CA) from the SP1 spacer protein. First, bevirimat enters a growing virus particle as it buds from an infected cell and binds to the Gag polypeptide at the CA/SP1 cleavage site. This prevents the protease enzyme from cleaving CA-SP1. As the capsid protein remains bound to SP1, the virus particle core is prevented from compressing into its normal mature shape, which is crucial for infectivity, resulting in the release of an immature, non-infectious particle.

== Metabolism ==
It has been found that bevirimat does not inhibit the cytochrome P450 system or interact with the human P-glycoprotein. Unformulated bevirimat is not well absorbed from the gastrointestinal tract into the blood. Some of the less desirable properties of unformulated bevirimat and its salts include: inadequate bioavailability, poor solubility of the pharmaceutical composition in gastric fluid, insufficient dispersion of bevirimat in gastric fluid, below standard long term safety profile for oral dosage forms, below standard long term chemical and physical stability of the final dosage form, tendency for conversion to metastable forms, lengthy dissolution times for oral dosage forms, and precipitation in gastric or intestinal fluids. Some pharmaceutical compositions of formulated bevirimat have shown to have better properties over unformulated bevirimat. Some of these properties include: improved bioavailability, improved solubility of the composition in gastric fluid, improved dispersion of bevirimat in gastric fluid, improved safety for oral dosage forms, improved chemical and physical stability of the oral dosage form, decreased conversion to metastable forms, and decreased rate of precipitation in gastric fluid. Bevirimat was rapidly absorbed after oral administration, with detectable concentrations present in the plasma within 15 minutes after administration and peak plasma concentrations were achieved approximately one to three hours after administration. The plasma had a mean plasma elimination half-life ranging from 58 to 80 hours. This long half-life of bevirimat supports once-daily dosing. Elimination of bevirimat is primarily via hepatobiliary routes, with renal elimination counting for less than 1% of the dose.

== Toxicity and side effects ==
Preclinical studies have not presented any sign that bevirimat might be associated with any specific safety concerns that would limit its clinical use. In vitro preclinical studies in human cells propose that bevirimat should have low potential for cytotoxicity. There is no evidence of any reproductive or developmental toxicity and it is not immunotoxic. Bevirimat was initially evaluated for safety and pharmacokinetics in a single-dose, randomized, double-blind, placebo-controlled phase clinical study in healthy volunteers. It was administered as an oral solution in doses of 25, 50, 100, and 250 mg. The plasma concentrations were dose-proportional, and the compound was seen to be safe and well tolerated with no dose-limiting toxicities and no serious adverse effects. In one clinical trial, headaches was the most commonly reported side effect of bevirimat, reported by four participants on bevirimat and one on the placebo. The second most common reported side effect was throat discomfort by two participants on bevirimat. No serious adverse effects were reported, all adverse effects reported were mild, and no participants discontinued use of bevirimat because of the adverse effects.

== Resistance ==
In vitro studies have shown that presence of a number of single nucleotide polymorphisms in the CA/SP1 cleavage site have resulted in resistance to bevirimat. However, mutations at these sites were not found in phase I and II clinical trials. Instead, mutations in the glutamine-valine-threonine (QVT) motif of the SP1 peptide are also known to cause bevirimat resistance. In addition, V362I mutations have been shown to confer strong resistance to bevirimat, where the S373P and I376V mutations may confer low resistance to bevirimat. A further complication of the use of bevirimat is that, since bevirimat targets the CA/SP1 cleavage site, it could also be used in the treatment of protease inhibitor resistant patients. Except for A364V, mutations in the CA/SP1 cleavage site have resulted in fitness deficits when combined with protease inhibitor resistance. This proposes that these mutations may develop slowly. It has been shown that protease inhibitor resistance can result in an increase in the occurrence of mutations within the downstream QVT motif.

== Clinical trials ==
In December 2007, some results of the Phase IIb trial were released. Thomson Financial News reported that, "some patients respond 'very well' to the drug, while another population 'does not respond as well at current dose levels.'" Panacos said it intends to add a group to the study at a higher dosage. The drug manufacturer, Panacos, has stated that success with bevirimat hinges on a patient's particular HIV not having a specific group of genetic mutations in HIV’s Gag protein. When they evaluated the study participants’ virus and found that the participant’s virologic response depended greatly on whether or not the Gag protein of a participant’s virus had polymorphisms—multiple mutations in the protein’s structure. After sampling the virus of 100 patients in the company’s database, they found that about 50 percent did not have Gag polymorphisms, meaning that about 50 percent would likely respond well to the drug.

== See also ==
- BMS-955176
