= Corosolic acid =

Names
- IUPAC name 2α,3β-Dihydroxyurs-12-en-28-oic acid
- Systematic IUPAC name (1S,2R,4aS,6aS,6bR,8aR,10R,11R,12aR,12bR,14bS)-10,11-Dihydroxy-1,2,6a,6b,9,9,12a-heptamethyl-1,3,4,5,6,6a,6b,7,8,8a,9,10,11,12,12a,12b,13,14b-octadecahydropicene-4a(2H)-carboxylic acid
- Other names Glucosol; Corsolic acid; Colosic acid; 2α-Hydroxyursolic acid

Identifiers
CAS Number	4547-24-4
3D model (JSmol)	Interactive image
ChemSpider	5293965
ECHA InfoCard	100.125.730
PubChem CID	6918774
UNII	AMX2I57A98
CompTox Dashboard (EPA)	DTXSID70904142
- InChI: InChI=1S/C30H48O4/c1-17-10-13-30(25(33)34)15-14-28(6)19(23(30)18(17)2)8-9-22-27(5)16-20(31)24(32)26(3,4)21(27)11-12-29(22,28)7/h8,17-18,20-24,31-32H,9-16H2,1-7H3,(H,33,34)/t17-,18+,20-,21+,22-,23+,24+,27+,28-,29-,30+/m1/s1 Key: HFGSQOYIOKBQOW-ZSDYHTTISA-N; InChI=1/C30H48O4/c1-17-10-13-30(25(33)34)15-14-28(6)19(23(30)18(17)2)8-9-22-27(5)16-20(31)24(32)26(3,4)21(27)11-12-29(22,28)7/h8,17-18,20-24,31-32H,9-16H2,1-7H3,(H,33,34)/t17-,18+,20-,21+,22-,23+,24+,27+,28-,29-,30+/m1/s1 Key: HFGSQOYIOKBQOW-ZSDYHTTIBC
- SMILES: O=C(O)[C@@]54[C@H](/C3=C/C[C@H]1[C@](CC[C@@H]2[C@]1(C)C[C@@H](O)[C@H](O)C2(C)C)(C)[C@]3(C)CC4)[C@@H](C)[C@H](C)CC5

Properties
Chemical formula	C_{30}H_{48}O_{4}
Molar mass	472.710 g·mol^{−1}
- Except where otherwise noted, data are given for materials in their standard state (at 25 °C [77 °F], 100 kPa). Infobox references

Corosolic acid is a pentacyclic triterpene acid found in Lagerstroemia speciosa. It is similar in structure to ursolic acid, differing only in the fact that it has a 2-alpha-hydroxy group.

ursolic acid
