= Oleanolic acid =

Pentacyclic chemical compound in plant leaves and fruit

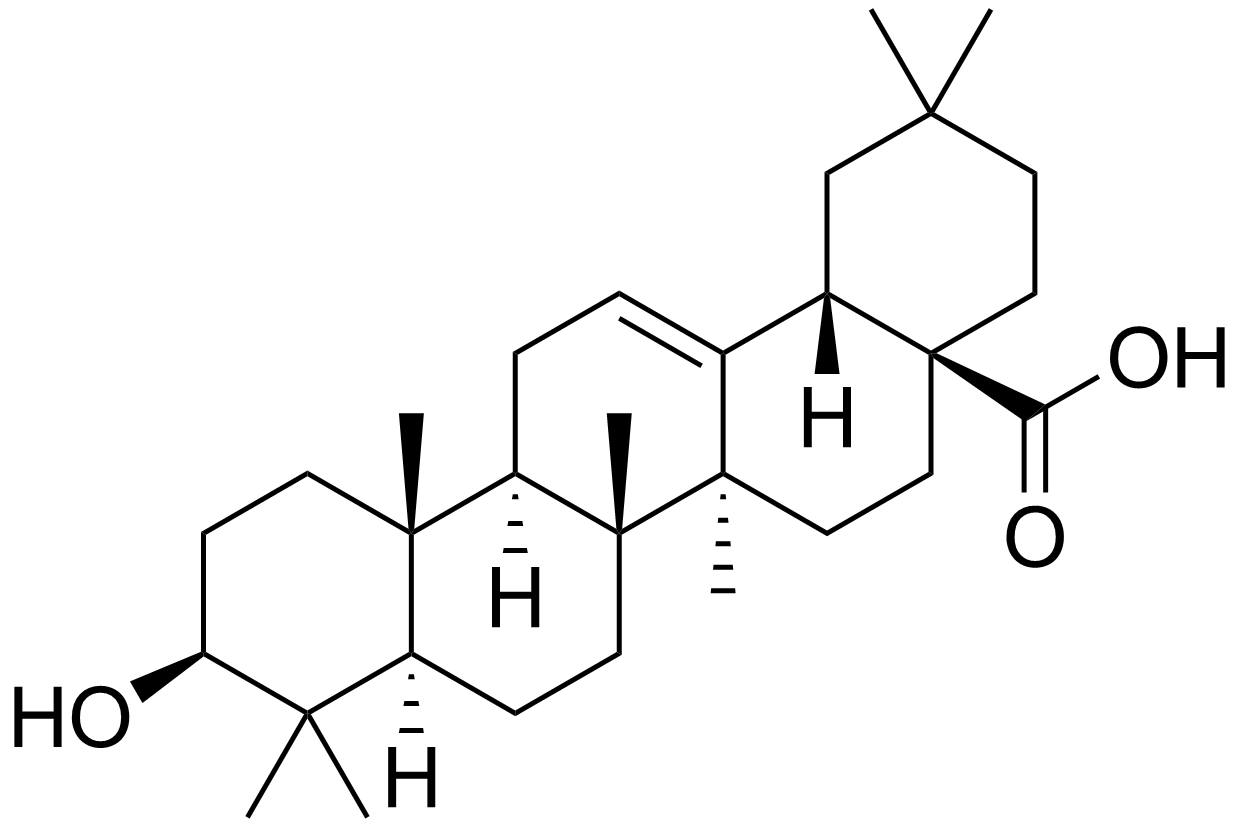
- Oleanolic acid

Names
- IUPAC name 3β-Hydroxyolean-12-en-28-oic acid
- Systematic IUPAC name (4aS,6aS,6bR,8aR,10S,12aR,12bR,14bS)-10-Hydroxy-2,2,6a,6b,9,9,12a-heptamethyl-1,3,4,5,6,6a,6b,7,8,8a,9,10,11,12,12a,12b,13,14b-octadecahydropicene-4a(2H)-carboxylic acid
- Other names Oleanic acid

Identifiers
CAS Number	508-02-1
3D model (JSmol)	Interactive image
ChEBI	CHEBI:37659
ChEMBL	ChEMBL168
ChemSpider	10062
ECHA InfoCard	100.007.347
EC Number	208-081-6
IUPHAR/BPS	3306
PubChem CID	10494
UNII	6SMK8R7TGJ
CompTox Dashboard (EPA)	DTXSID50858790
- InChI: InChI=1S/C30H48O3/c1-25(2)14-16-30(24(32)33)17-15-28(6)19(20(30)18-25)8-9-22-27(5)12-11-23(31)26(3,4)21(27)10-13-29(22,28)7/h8,20-23,31H,9-18H2,1-7H3,(H,32,33)/t20-,21-,22+,23-,27-,28+,29+,30-/m0/s1 Key: MIJYXULNPSFWEK-GTOFXWBISA-N; InChI=1S/C30H48O3/c1-25(2)14-16-30(24(32)33)17-15-28(6)19(20(30)18-25)8-9-22-27(5)12-11-23(31)26(3,4)21(27)10-13-29(22,28)7/h8,20-23,31H,9-18H2,1-7H3,(H,32,33)/t20-,21-,22+,23-,27-,28+,29+,30-/m0/s1 Key: MIJYXULNPSFWEK-GTOFXWBIBS; Key: MIJYXULNPSFWEK-GTOFXWBISA-N
- SMILES: O=C(O)[C@@]54[C@H](/C3=C/C[C@H]1[C@](CC[C@@H]2[C@]1(C)CC[C@H](O)C2(C)C)(C)[C@]3(C)CC4)CC(C)(C)CC5

Properties
Chemical formula	C_{30}H_{48}O_{3}
Molar mass	456.711 g·mol^{−1}
Appearance	White
Melting point	> 300 °C (572 °F; 573 K)
- Except where otherwise noted, data are given for materials in their standard state (at 25 °C [77 °F], 100 kPa). verify (what is ?) Infobox references

Oleanolic acid or oleanic acid is a naturally occurring pentacyclic triterpenoid related to betulinic acid. It is widely distributed in food and plants where it exists as a free acid or as an aglycone of triterpenoid saponins.

== Natural occurrence ==
Oleanolic acid can be found in olive oil, Phytolacca americana (American pokeweed), and Syzygium spp, garlic, etc. It was first studied and isolated from several plants, including Olea europaea (leaves, fruit), Rosa woodsii (leaves), Prosopis glandulosa (leaves and twigs), Phoradendron juniperinum (whole plant), Syzygium claviflorum (leaves), Hyptis capitata (whole plant), Mirabilis jalapa and Ternstroemia gymnanthera (aerial part). Other Syzygium species including java apple (Syzygium samarangense) and rose apples contain it, as does Ocimum tenuiflorum (holy basil).

== Biosynthesis of oleanolic acids ==
Oleanolic acid biosynthesis starts with mevalonate to create squalene. Squalene monooxygenase in the next step oxidases the squalene and forms an epoxide resulting in 2,3-oxidosqualene. Beta-amyrin synthase creates beta-amyrin by a ring formation cascade. After the formation of beta amyrin, CYP716AATR2, also known as a cytochrome p450 enzyme, oxidizes carbon 28 turning it into alcohol. CYP716AATR2 converts the alcohol to aldehyde and finally to a carboxylic acid forming oleanolic acid.

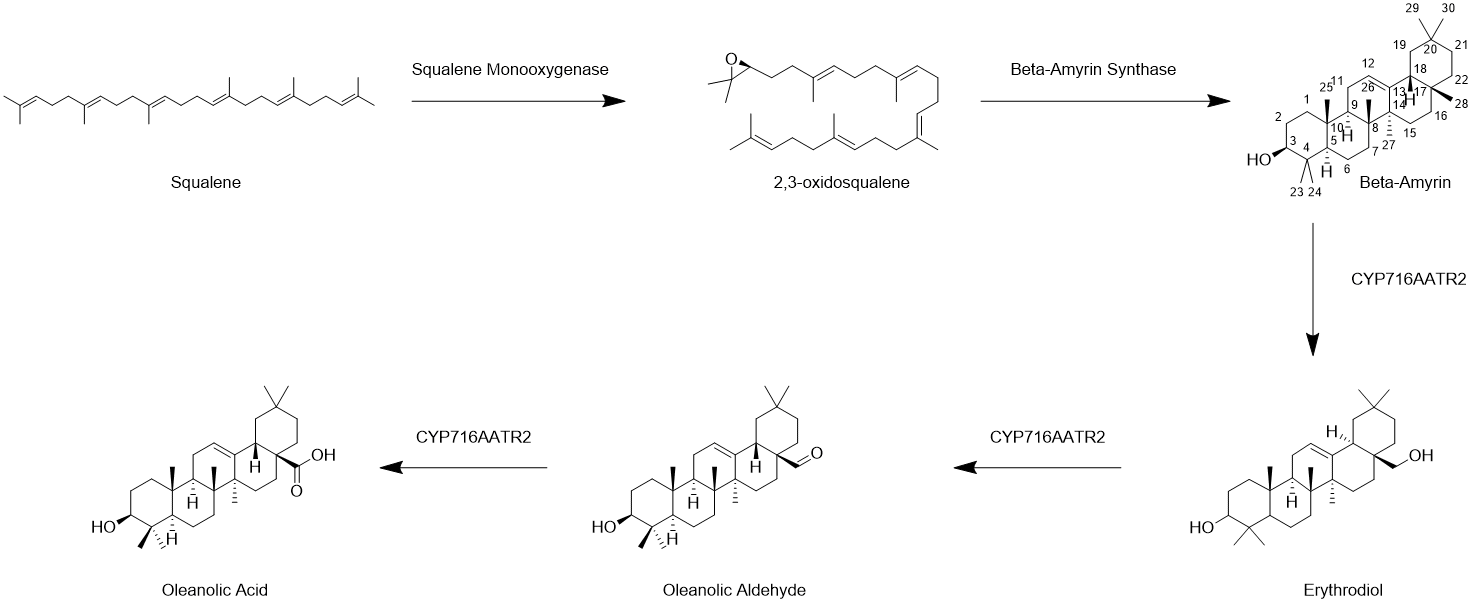
Biosynthesis of Oleanolic Acid in Saccharomyces Cerevisiae

== Pharmacological research ==
Oleanolic acid is relatively non-toxic, hepatoprotective, and exhibits antitumor and antiviral properties. Oleanolic acid was found to exhibit weak anti-HIV and weak anti-HCV activities in vitro, but more potent synthetic analogs are being investigated as potential drugs.

An extremely potent synthetic triterpenoid analog of oleanolic acid was found in 2005, that is a powerful inhibitor of cellular inflammatory processes. They work by the induction by IFN-γ of inducible nitric oxide synthase (iNOS) and of cyclooxygenase 2 in mouse macrophages. They are extremely potent inducers of the phase 2 response (e.g., elevation of NADH-quinone oxidoreductase and heme oxygenase 1), which is a major protector of cells against oxidative and electrophile stress.

A 2002 study in Wistar rats found that oleanolic acid reduced sperm quality and motility, causing infertility. After withdrawing exposure, male rats regained fertility and successfully impregnated female rats. Oleanolic acid is also used as standard for comparison of hyaluronidase, elastase and matrix-metalloproteinase-1 inhibition of other substances in primary research (similar to diclofenac sodium for comparison of analgesic activity).

Oleanolic acid activates telomerase in peripheral blood mononuclear cells (PBMCs) 5.9-fold, more than any other compounded tested, with the exception of Centella asiatica (8.8-fold). Less telomerase activation is seen for Astragalus extract 4.3-fold, TA-65 2.2-fold, and maslinic acid 2-fold.

== See also ==
- Ursolic acid
- Betulinic acid
- Moronic acid
- Momordin (saponin), a glycoside of oleanolic acid
- List of phytochemicals in food
