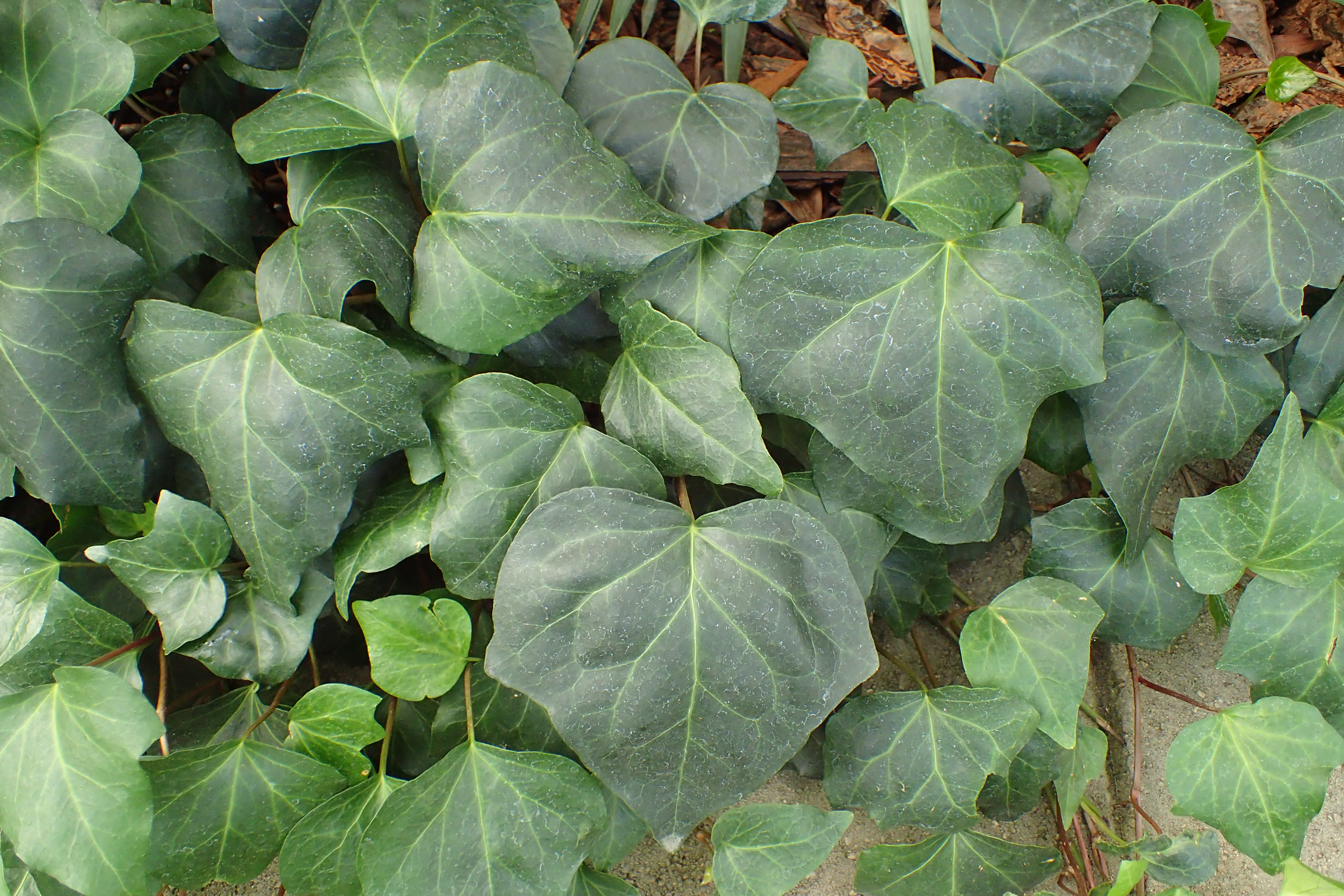

Scientific classification
- Kingdom: Plantae
- Clade: Tracheophytes
- Clade: Angiosperms
- Clade: Eudicots
- Clade: Asterids
- Order: Apiales
- Family: Araliaceae
- Genus: Hedera
- Species: H. algeriensis

Binomial name
- Hedera algeriensis Hibberd

= Hedera algeriensis =

Species of vine

Hedera algeriensis, the Algerian ivy, is a species of evergreen ivy native to the North African coast, including coastal mountains in Algeria.

== Description ==
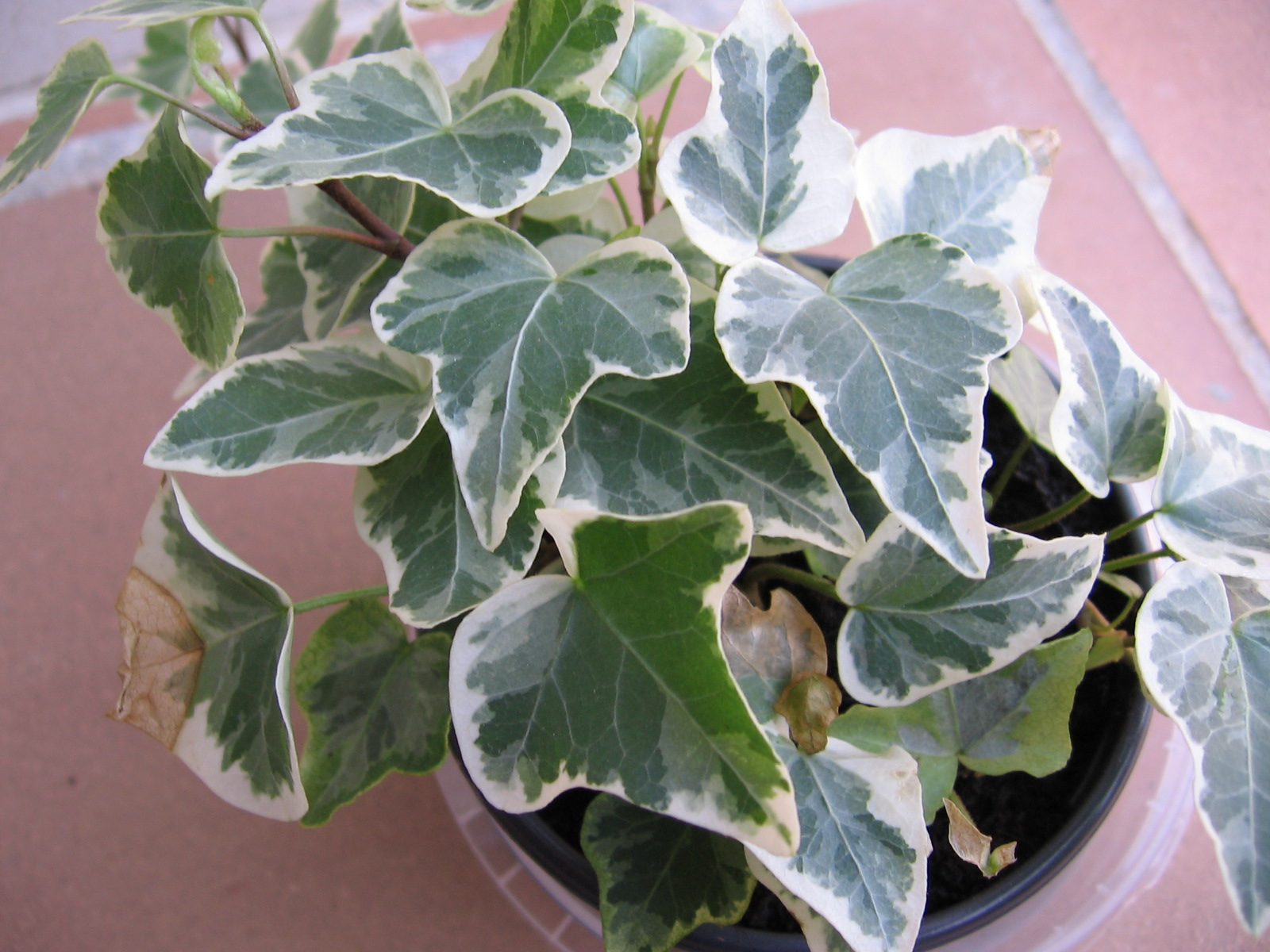
Variegated cultivar

It is a vigorous, large evergreen climber, self-clinging by aerial roots. The stems are reddish, partly decorated with stellate hairs or scales, reddish-starred with about 15 rays. The leaves are alternate and simple. As in other Hedera species, the fertile branches have stiff stems with leaves having usually fewer lobes compared to the sterile (juvenile) stems. The main part of the leaf (the lamina) is oval-rhombic, 12–20 cm by 5–12 cm on flowering branches and coarsely toothed or slightly lobed (3–5 lobes) on the sterile stems. The inflorescence is a cluster of 13–15 pubescent flowers. Small flowers in umbels develop only on the fertile stems or branches.

The plant contains the glycoside hederagenin, mostly in the leaves and berries, which could cause a mild toxicosis. If these parts are ingested it may cause severe discomfort, and handling plants may cause skin irritation or an allergic reaction.

== Ecology ==
It may be a noxious weed or be invasive. It naturalizes in mild climates and lowlands. It requires consistently moist soil, but is more resistant to environmental dryness than most related species and can stand drought better than other ivies. It tolerates low temperatures better than island species of similar latitudes, such as Hedera canariensis, Hedera maderensis, Hedera azorica, or Hedera cypria. It is native to the North African coast and coastal mountains where the climate is cooler and condensation provides a more humid habitat. It is frost sensitive at about the -2 °C winter isotherm but can become naturalised in mild climates. The plant is rejected by herbivorous animals. Variegated cultivars of Hedera algeriensis are widely used in gardening.

Hedera algeriensis arose from a common ancestor in the cloud forest habitat in the Mediterranean area. The northern African Hedera and northeast Atlantic species of the genus Hedera are closely related species. Until recently it was thought there was a single species, Hedera helix, but recent studies have shown that there are several species that differ mainly by microscopic details of the hairiness of the buds. Hedera maroccana, Hedera iberica, and Hedera canariensis are closely related.

== Landscaping ==
The cultivar 'Ravensholst' has gained the Royal Horticultural Society's Award of Garden Merit.

In Coastal California Algerian ivy is used as a ground cover on highway embankments to help control erosion. Without irrigation it can be difficult to establish and maintain, and can hide underlying dead, dry material, which can be a fire hazard. The ivy groundcover provides cover, food and herbage for roof rats and snails.
