= Japanese ivy =

Japanese ivy may refer to:

- Hedera rhombea, see ivy
- Parthenocissus tricuspidata, also known as Japanese creeper, Boston ivy, Grape ivy, Japanese ivy, a flowering plant in the grape family (Vitaceae) native to eastern Asia in Japan, Korea, and northern and eastern China
