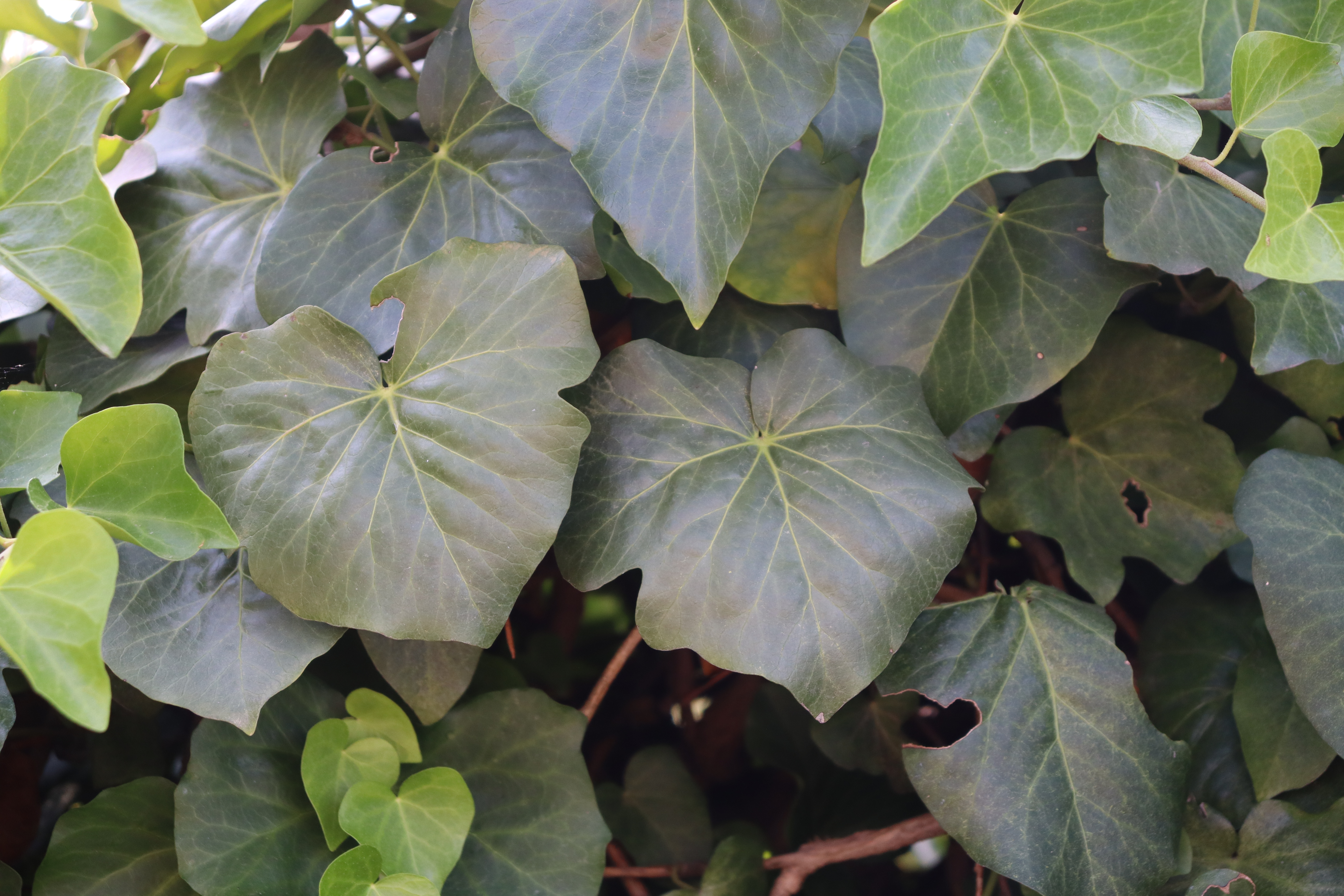
- Juvenile foliage leaves of Hedera crebrescens

Scientific classification
- Kingdom: Plantae
- Clade: Tracheophytes
- Clade: Angiosperms
- Clade: Eudicots
- Clade: Asterids
- Order: Apiales
- Family: Araliaceae
- Genus: Hedera
- Species: H. crebrescens

Binomial name
- Hedera crebrescens M.Bényei-Himmer & M.Höhn

= Hedera crebrescens =

Species of flowering plant

Hedera crebrescens is a species of ivy in the flowering plant family Araliaceae. It is found in central Europe, where it is now a potentially invasive species. First described in 2017, the species has also subsequently been identified from herbarium specimens collected back to the 19th century.

== Description ==
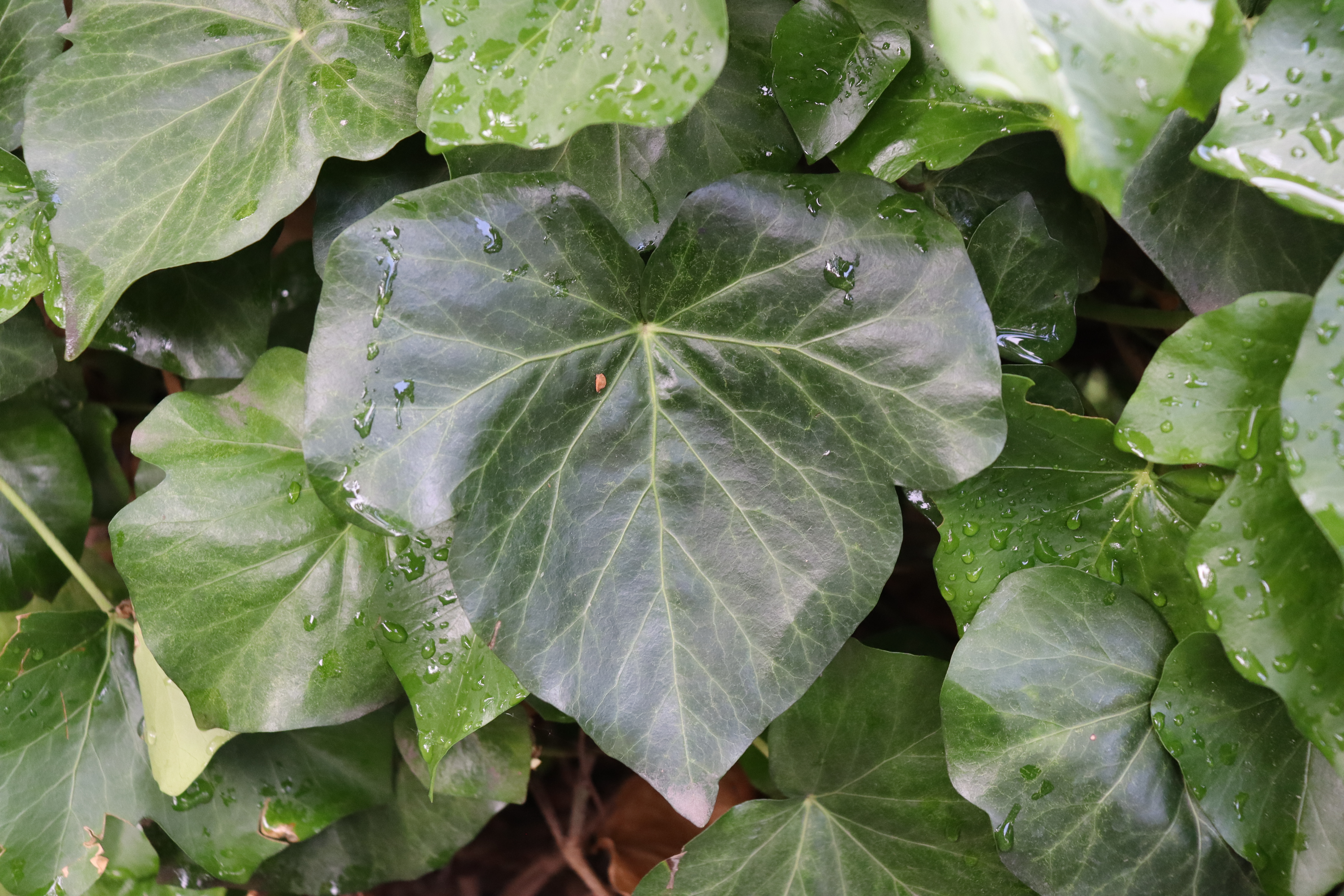
The dome-shaped central lobe

On the creeping shoots, the juvenile leaves are three-lobed. The upper (central) lobe is dome-shaped and sharply pointed. The leaf bases often overlap, and the leaf blades are broad, nearly as wide as long. The leaves are slightly frost-sensitive, suffering damage after long periods at below −10 °C (14 °F).

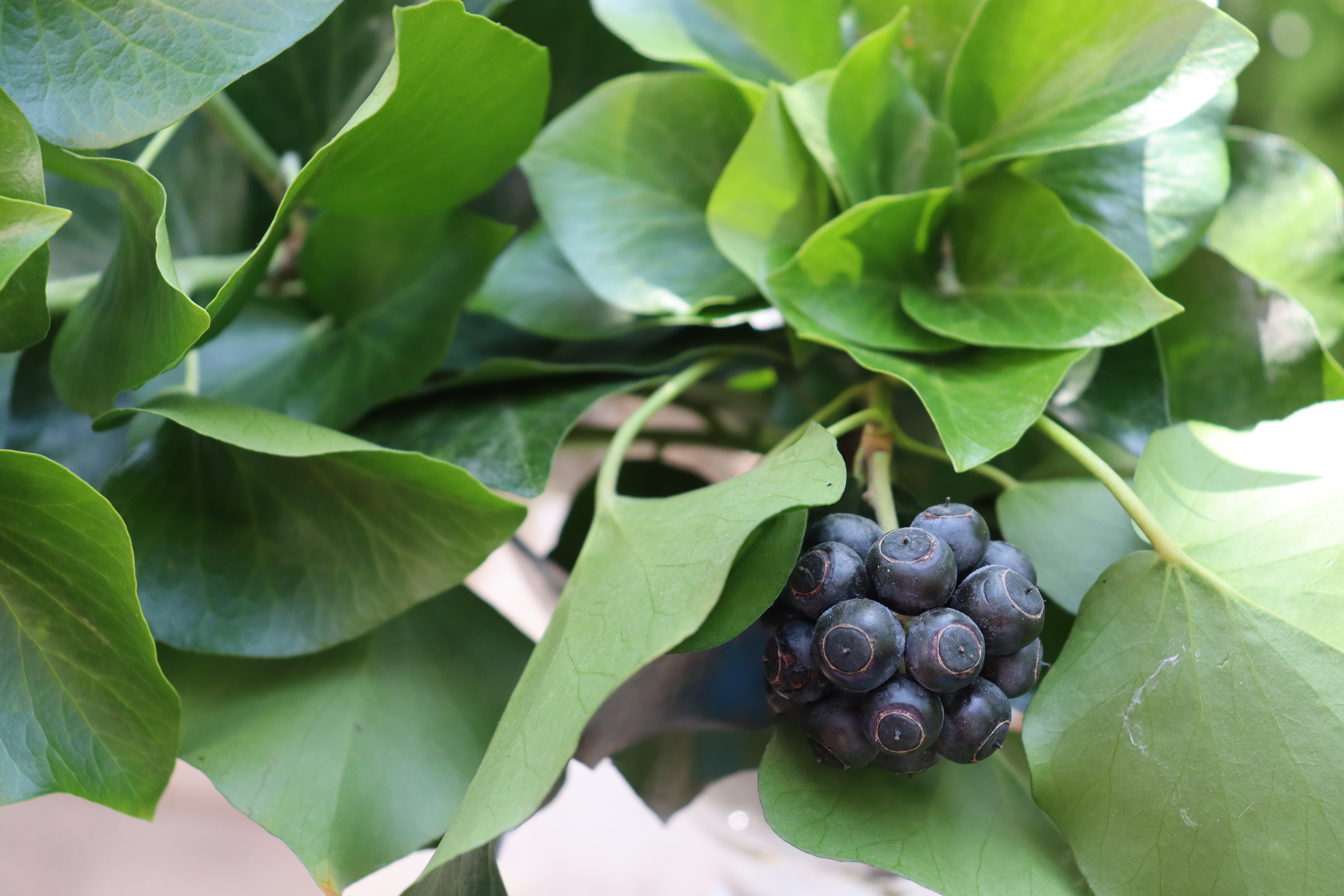
Fruit of Hedera crebrescens

Only the terminal umbel develops fruit, while lateral umbels abort and wither. The berries in this terminal umbel are densely packed, and are green when immature, turning black when ripe.

== Taxonomy ==
Hedera crebrescens was confirmed a species of independent status in 2017, in Hungary, at the Department of Botany, Buda Campus, MATE (former Szent István University), after 20 years of research through morphological and genetic studies.

The species has been identified in herbarium specimens from Hungary and Slovakia tracing back to the late 19th century, where it was previously considered a variety of Hedera hibernica due to morphological similarity. However, cytological and morphological analyses demonstrated that it is indeed a separate species from H. hibernica, as that is tetraploid, while Hedera crebrescens is diploid. It also differs from the diploid Hedera helix by a series of morpho-phenological traits.

== Distribution and habitat ==
First identified in Hungary, H. crebrescens has also been found in Austria, Germany, the Netherlands, Slovakia, and Ukraine.

Preferring shaded, semi-humid conditions, it commonly grows along railways and in or around cemeteries, parks, and unmaintained gardens.

== Ecology ==
Observations since the late 2010s have indicated that H. crebrescens spreads easily and is displacing other native ivy species from their habitats in parts of central Europe.

Further studies are required to assess the growth and distribution of the species, and to implement measures to control its spread. The citizen science Ivy Mapping Project was launched in Hungary in 2022 with a goal of mapping the present distribution of H. crebrescens through the work of volunteers.
