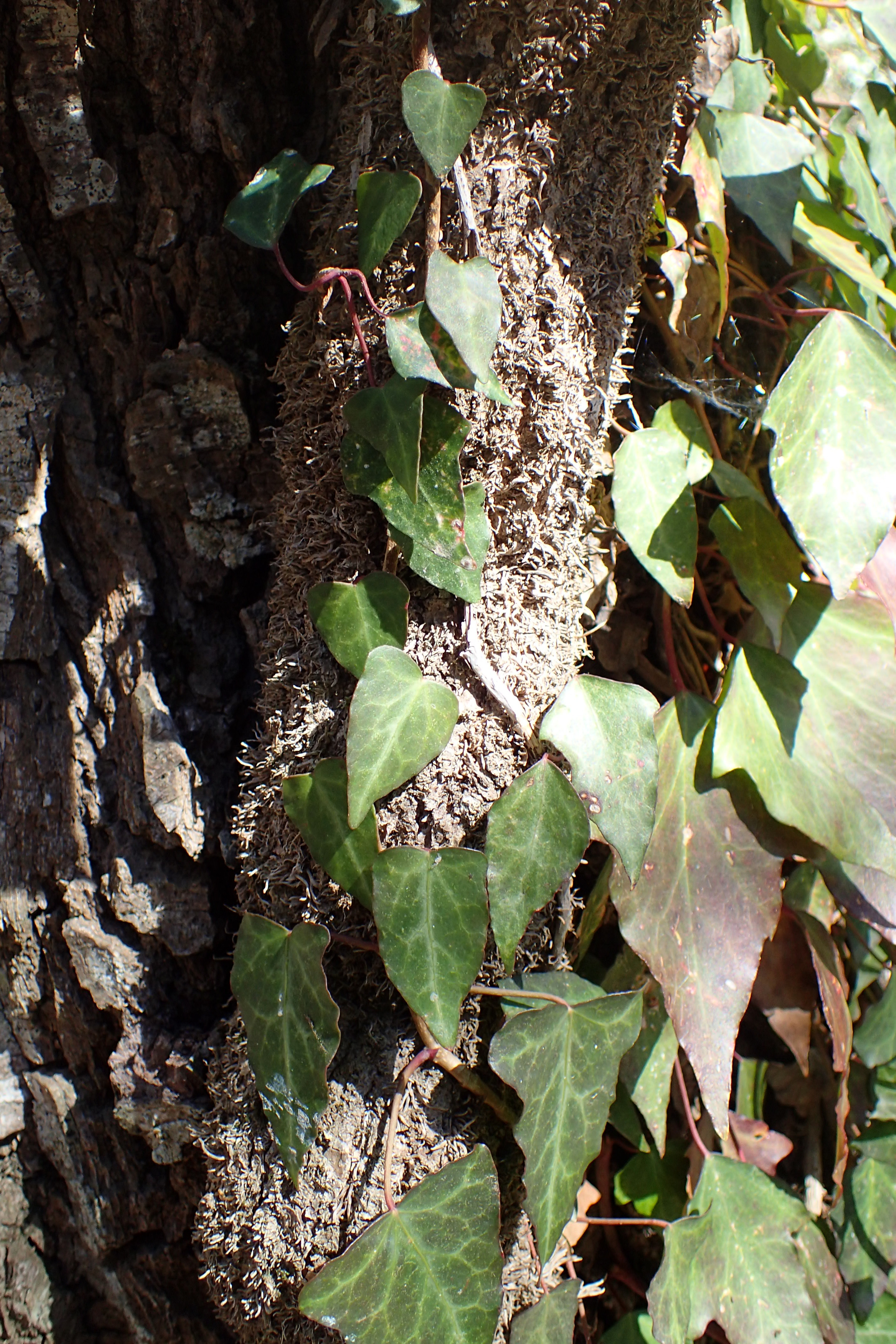
- Hedera cypria near Caledonia Waterfall in Cyprus

Scientific classification
- Kingdom: Plantae
- Clade: Embryophytes
- Clade: Tracheophytes
- Clade: Spermatophytes
- Clade: Angiosperms
- Clade: Eudicots
- Clade: Asterids
- Order: Apiales
- Family: Araliaceae
- Genus: Hedera
- Species: H. cypria

Binomial name
- Hedera cypria McAll.

= Hedera cypria =

Species of vine

Hedera cypria is a species of Ivy (genus Hedera) which is endemic to the island of Cyprus. The species is a climbing plant. It is natively found in higher altitudes in Cyprus. H. cypria has unique trichomes and fruits to separate it from closely related plants. It is not considered an invasive ivy where it is found in the United States.

== Etymology ==
The origin of the genus name, hedera, comes from the latin word for ivy. Cypria, meaning from Cyprus, was chosen to reflect the endemic area of the species origin.

== Growth ==
It is an evergreen climbing plant, growing slowly to 20–30 m high where suitable surfaces are available, and also growing as ground cover where there are no vertical surfaces. It climbs by means of aerial rootlets which cling to the substrate. The plant is commonly found in altitudes of 400 to 500m, often in shaded areas that provide a rocky surface and a nearby source of water.

== Physical and genetic characteristics ==
Hedera cypria does not resemble any other ivy into such a unique white patterns conspicuous grey veining, red stemmed. It is also the only of its relatives to have trichomes present only on the abaxial surface (or under side) of its leaves. The trichomes found on hedera cypria are red and scale-like. It is an attractive robust plant, growing slowly. It has alternate and small to medium ovate leaves, with a long petiole; there are two types of leaves, palmately five-lobed juvenile leaves on creeping and climbing stems, and unlobed lauroid adult leaves on fertile flowering stems. In this species, the juvenile leaves are almost unlobed with an isosceles triangle shape, and the green leaf is blotched with a grid of leaf-nerves that appear greenish-yellow to grey. The middle lobe on Hedera cypria leaves is twice the length of surrounding lobes, where as closely related species have smaller middle lobe ratios. Genetically, Hedera cypria is hexaploid. Its most closely related species genetically, H. helix 5, is diploid.

=== Differentiation between species ===
Hedera cypria was determined to be distinguished from Hedera helix subsp. poetarum, by Ackerfield and Wen because the latter has yellow fruits, while Hedera cypria is always black-fruited. However, there is not many specimens to validate this claim and it is still under debate.

Hedera cypria is closely related to Hedera pastuchovii. Hedera cypria is found on the island of Cyprus and H. pastuchovii is distributed in close proximity in Iran, Caucasus and Transcaucassus. The DNA analysis confirmed that they are not strongly separated but they must to be separated into distinct species, due largely to genetic differences that occur between other traits in the presence of distinct white markings over the veins in its young leaves as compared to less distinct white markings in young H. pastuchovii leaves, coupled with greater vigour in H. cypria plants.

== Invasivity ==
Ivy is considered invasive when it exploits a host by inhibiting the growth of the plant it is climbing, due to interrupting photosynthesis by blocking sunlight or weighing down and damaging the host plant. Trees are mostly affected by invasive ivy. Where Hedera cypria is found in North America, on the East and West coasts, it is not considered invasive. Its closely related relative, Hedera hibernica (a subspecies of hedera helix), is considered invasive in those areas. Both types of invasive H. helix subspecies hibernica are found to be diploid with stellate trichomes, compared to the scale-like trichomes of hexaploid Hedera cypria.
