= Bığbığ Ivy =

Ancient climbing plant in Adana, Turkey

Coordinates: 37°31′47″N 35°22′35″E

Bığbığ Ivy (Turkish: Bığbığ Orman Sarmaşığı) is a very old climbing plant located in Adana Province, southern Turkey.

Bığbığ Ivy is located at Meydan Yaylası (highland) of Aladağ district in Adana Province. Situated in Bığbığı location at 1,222 m (4,009 ft) high above main sea level, the ivy (Hedera helix) is dated to be around 4000 years old. It is 20 m (66 ft) long with a trunk circumference of 2.30 m (7.5 ft) and a canopy size of 21 m (69 ft).

The plant was registered a natural monument on June 6, 1994. The protected area of the plant covers 154 m^{2} (1,660 sq ft).
