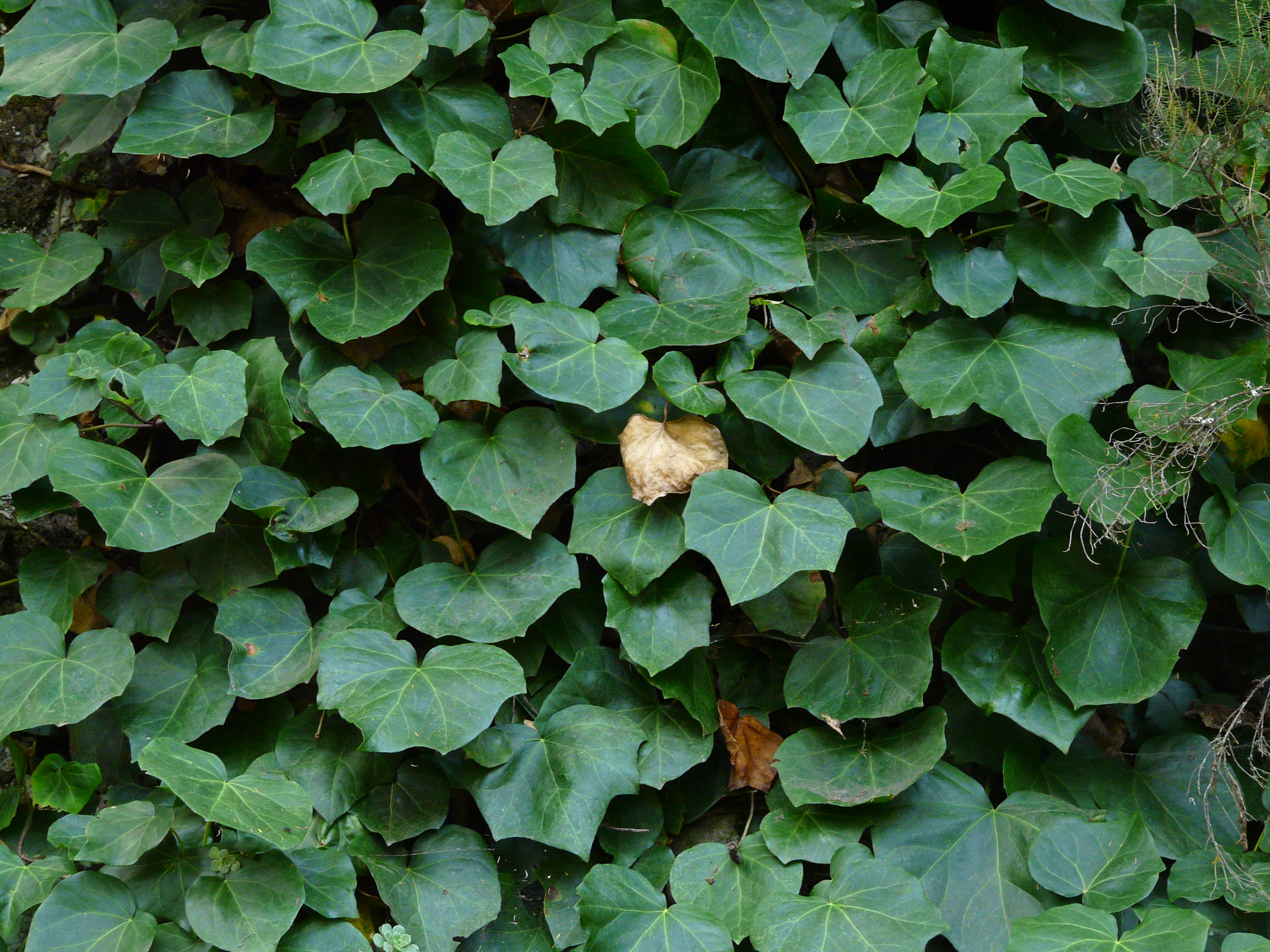
- Juvenile leaves at Gomera in the Canary Islands, Spain

Scientific classification
- Kingdom: Plantae
- Clade: Tracheophytes
- Clade: Angiosperms
- Clade: Eudicots
- Clade: Asterids
- Order: Apiales
- Family: Araliaceae
- Genus: Hedera
- Species: H. canariensis

Binomial name
- Hedera canariensis Willd.

Synonyms
- Hedera grandifolia Hibberd; Hedera helix var. canariensis (Willd.) DC.; Hedera helix subsp. canariensis (Willd.) Cout.; Hedera sevillana Sprenger; Hedera viridis (Hibberd) G.Nicholson

= Hedera canariensis =

Canary Island ivy

Species of vine

Hedera canariensis, the Canary Island ivy, Canary ivy or Madeira ivy, is a species of ivy, native to the Canary Islands and possibly the Atlantic coast of northern Africa.

== Description ==
It is an evergreen perennial climbing or trailing woody plant shrub or bush, growing to 20–30 m high where suitable surfaces (trees, cliffs, walls) are available, and also growing as ground cover where there are no vertical surfaces. It climbs by means of aerial rootlets which cling to the substrate. In warm climates, it grows more rapidly and becomes established faster than the related H. hibernica, and H. helix. It is endemic to the Canary Islands where it is quite common especially in Laurel forest of Barbusano.

The leaves of Hedera canariensis are broad, 5 to 20 cm, glossy dark green in colour and a little leathery, with 1-5 lobes, regular in size and shape. It is cultivated in gardens and used in floral arrangements. The flowers are greenish and the fruits, globular and black when ripe. Young stems are green or greenish-brown, sometimes tinged with red or purple, becoming grey or grey brown at maturity.

== Ecology ==
Cultivars

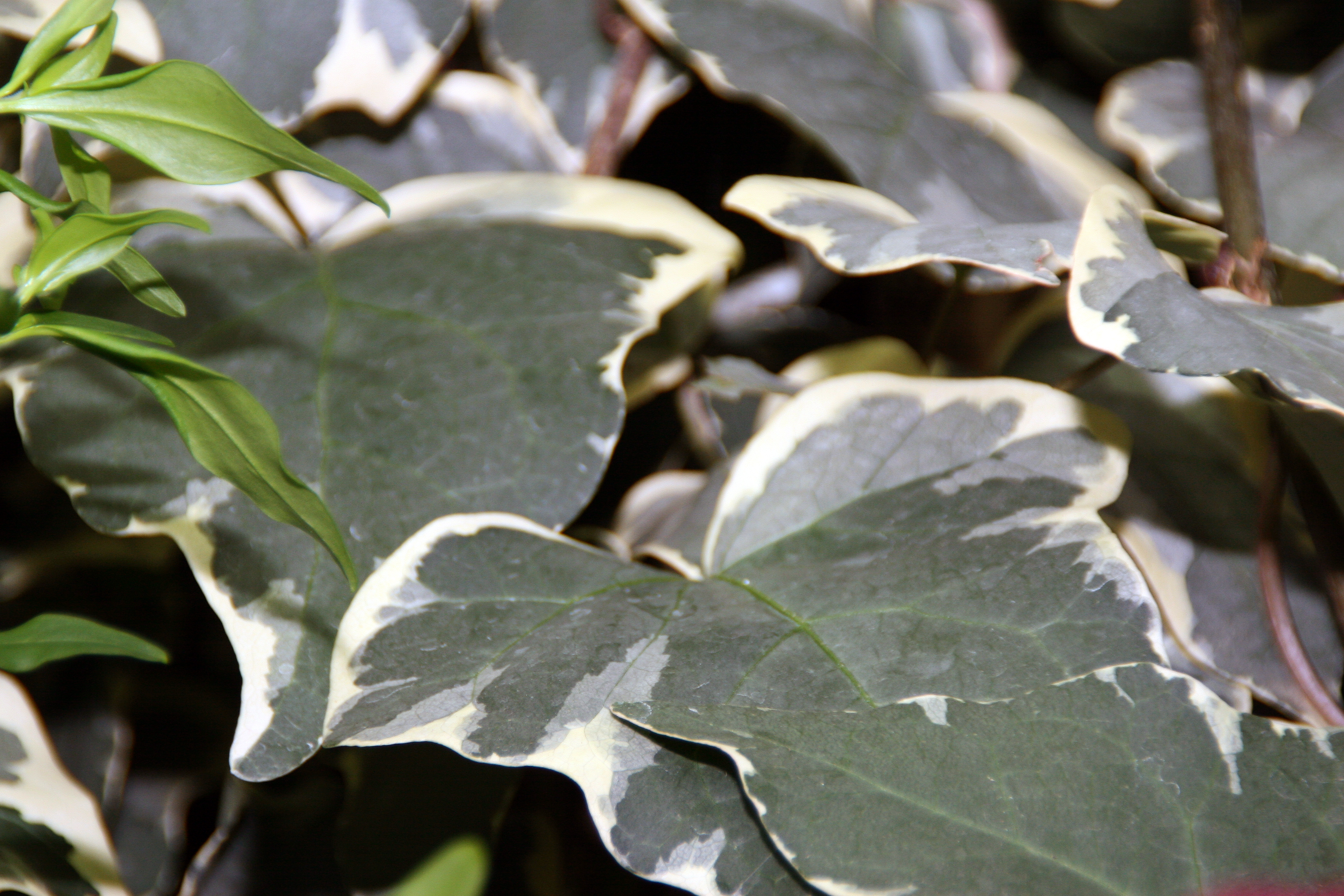
Hedera canariensis
‘Gloire de Marengo’

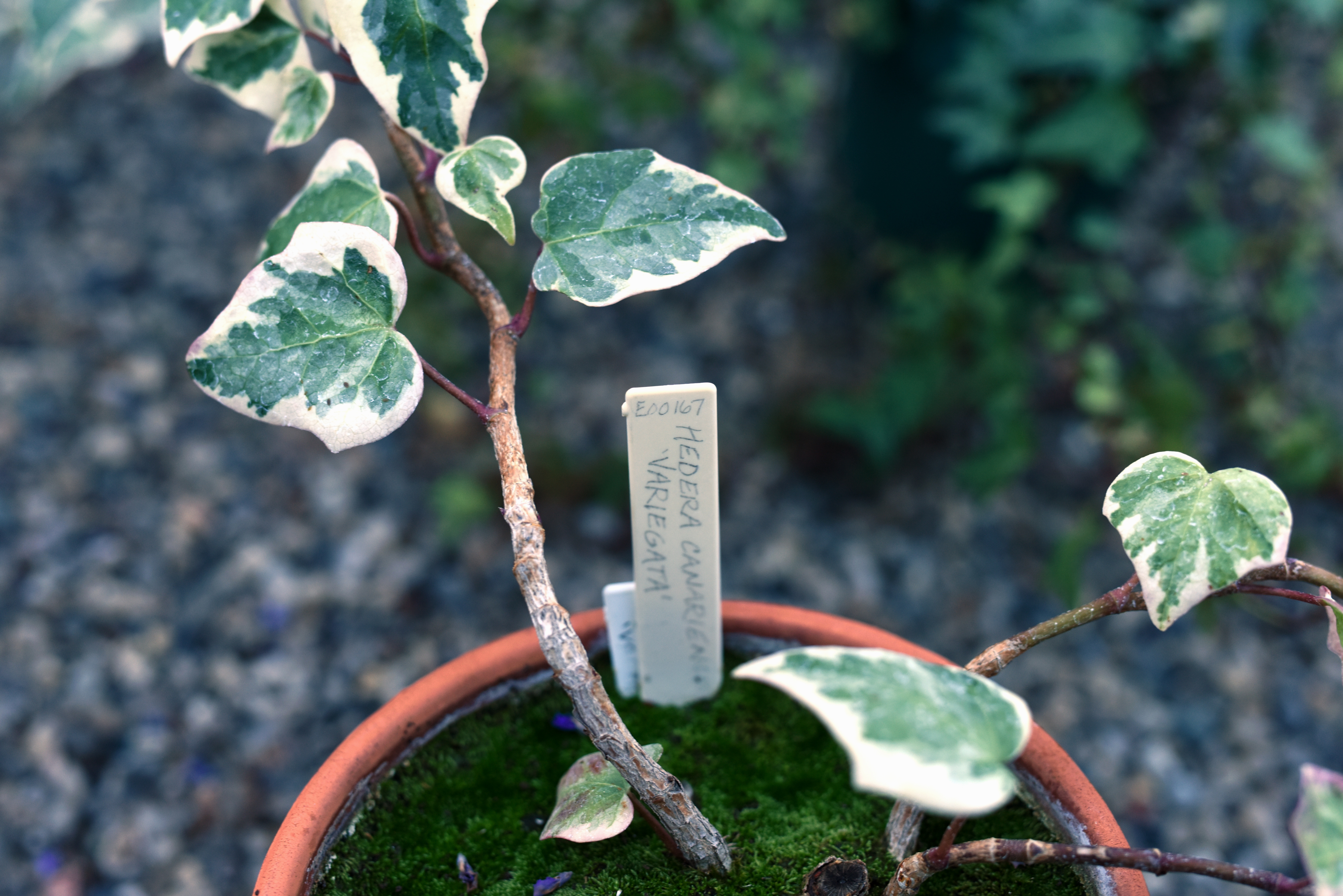
Hedera canariensis
‘Variegata’

They are climbing plants with evergreen leaves that may grow from the bottom of the ravines and river canyons lining the entire surface of the wall or cliff. Ivy climbs with adventitious roots and can reach up to 50 meter in length. Ivies are plants adapted to the laurel forest, a type of cloud forest habitat. European Ivy for example, is believed was spread by birds that helped to colonize large areas again where it had disappeared during the glaciations.

Ivy is a relict plant and one of the survivors of the laurel forest (laurisilva) flora in Europe that originally covered much of the Mediterranean Basin when the climate of the region was more humid in the Tertiary era. Laurisilva forests around the Mediterranean disappeared approximately ten thousand years ago at the end of the Pleistocene era, when the climate of the Mediterranean Basin became harsher and drier. Today laurisilva forest persists in some oceanic and island enclaves and Macaronesian islands in the North Atlantic Ocean, where climatic extremes have been moderated.

Ivies occur as opportunistic species across wide distributions with close relatives and few species, indicating the recent divergence of the species.

Seeds are spread by birds.

The island Hedera of Macaronesia in the eastern Atlantic, northern African Hedera and European Hedera are closely related species. Until recently it was thought there was a single species (Hedera helix), but recent studies have shown that there are several species that differ mainly by microscopic details of the hairiness of the buds. The patterns of speciation in Hedera are the product of vicariance, resulting from the fragmentation of the geographical range of a common ancestor that was more widespread during the Tertiary.
