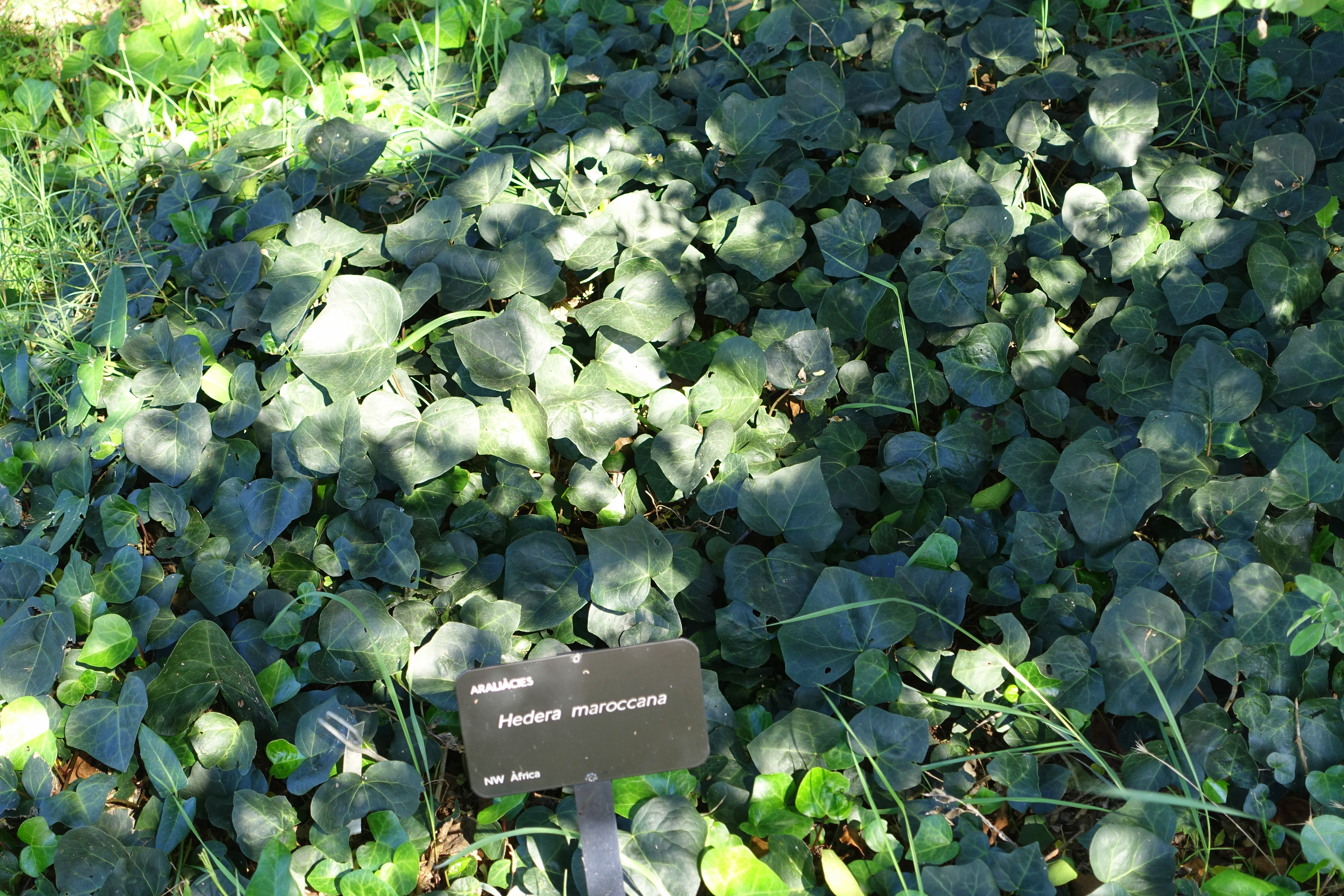

Scientific classification
- Kingdom: Plantae
- Clade: Tracheophytes
- Clade: Angiosperms
- Clade: Eudicots
- Clade: Asterids
- Order: Apiales
- Family: Araliaceae
- Genus: Hedera
- Species: H. maroccana

Binomial name
- Hedera maroccana (Kirchn.) Bean

= Hedera maroccana =

Species of vine

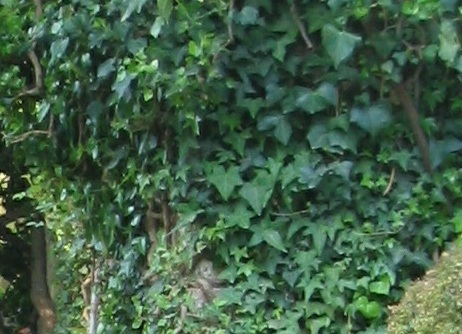
Hedera maroccana juvenile leaves, Granada, Partal Gardens southern Spain

Hedera maroccana, the Moroccan ivy, is a species of ivy (genus Hedera) which is native to the Atlantic coast in northern Africa. It is an evergreen climbing plant, growing to 20–30 m high where suitable surfaces (trees, cliffs, walls) are available, and also growing as ground cover where there are no vertical surfaces. It climbs by means of aerial rootlets which cling to the substrate. In warm climates, it grows more rapidly and becomes established a good bit faster than the related Hedera hibernica and Hedera helix.

The genus name Hedera is the classical Latin name for ivy. Maroccana is the Latin patronymic of Morocco, where the species was first described.

It is quite common in the Canary Islands and lives in slopes rock, soil, trunks of trees especially in Laurel forests dominated by Apollonias.

The flowers of Hedera maroccana are small, greenish, gathered in large numbers in umbels, and the fruits are globular and black when ripe. Stems are green or greenish-brown, sometimes tinged with red or purple. This plant has broad slightly leathery leaves, 2 to 8.5 inches long, reddish petioles and up to five juvenile leaf lobes, regular in size and shape. Over time it was cultivated in gardens and used in floral arrangements.

Hedera maroccana arose in the cloud forest in the Mediterranean area. The northern African and northeast Atlantic species of Hedera are closely related. Until recently it was thought there was a single species of ivy (Hedera helix), but recent studies have shown that there are several species that differ mainly by microscopic details of the hairiness of the buds.
