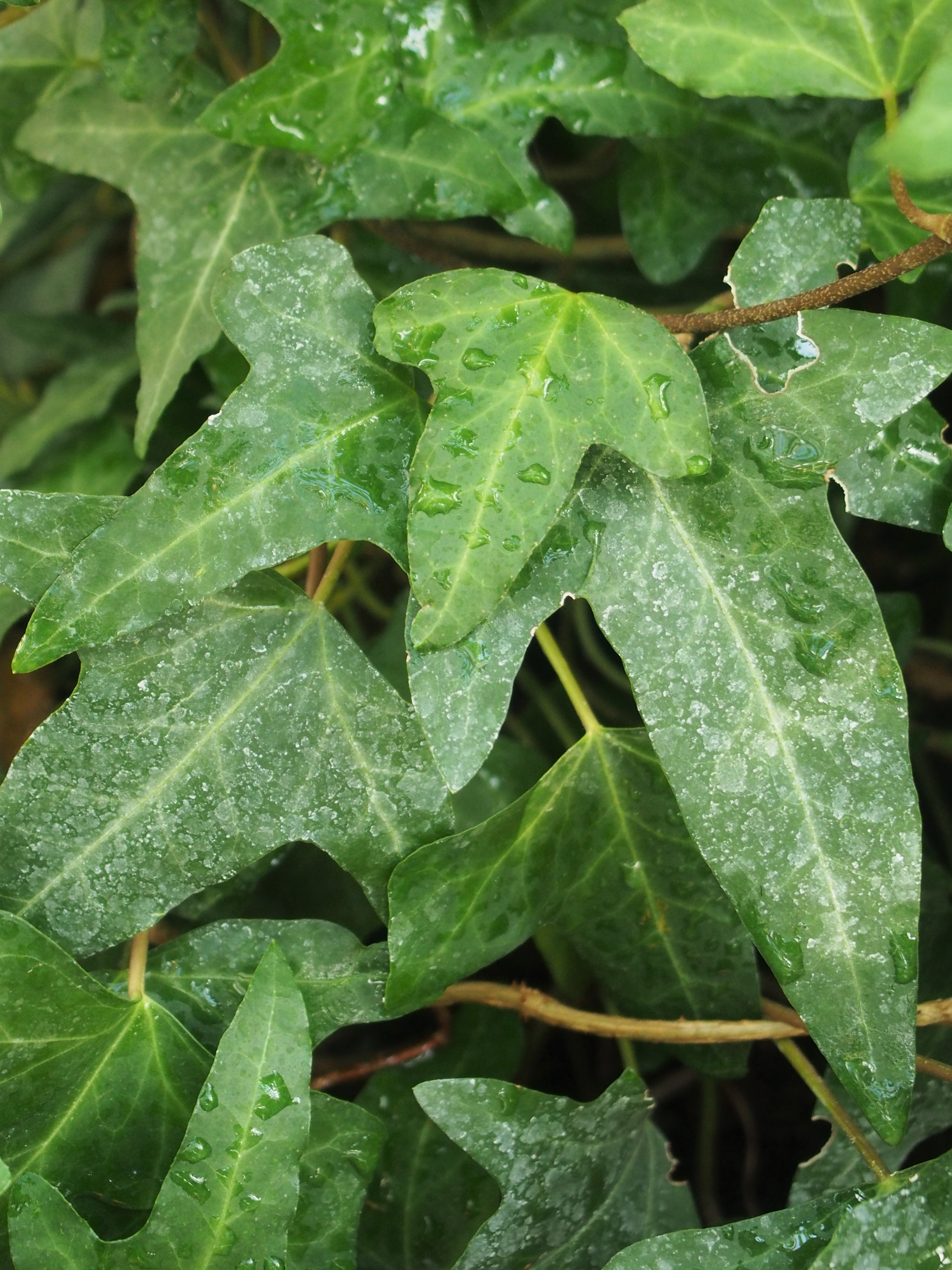

Scientific classification
- Kingdom: Plantae
- Clade: Tracheophytes
- Clade: Angiosperms
- Clade: Eudicots
- Clade: Asterids
- Order: Apiales
- Family: Araliaceae
- Genus: Hedera
- Species: H. iberica

Binomial name
- Hedera iberica (McAll.) Ackerf. & J.Wen

= Hedera iberica =

Species of vine

Hedera iberica is a species of ivy (genus Hedera) which is native to the western Iberian peninsula (Portugal and southwest Spain), and northern Morocco. It was formerly classified as a sub-species named Hedera maderensis iberica in Hedera maderensis (K. Koch ex A. Rutherf). The Iberian subspecies was subsequently classified as a distinct species. It grows on slopes, rock, soil, trunks of trees.

== Description ==
It is a climbing perennial shrub or bush with aerial roots. Stems are green or greenish-brown, sometimes tinged with red or purple. This plant has broad leathery leaves, 2 to 8.5 inches long, with 1-5 small lobes, regular in size and shape.

The flowers of Hedera iberica are small, greenish-yellow, gathered in large numbers in umbels, and the fruits are globular and black when ripe. This plant flowers from April to December. Over time it was cultivated in gardens and used in floral arrangements. It is an evergreen climbing plant, growing to 20–30 meters high where suitable surfaces (trees, cliffs, walls) are available, and also growing as ground cover where there are no vertical surfaces. It climbs by means of aerial rootlets which cling to the substrate.
