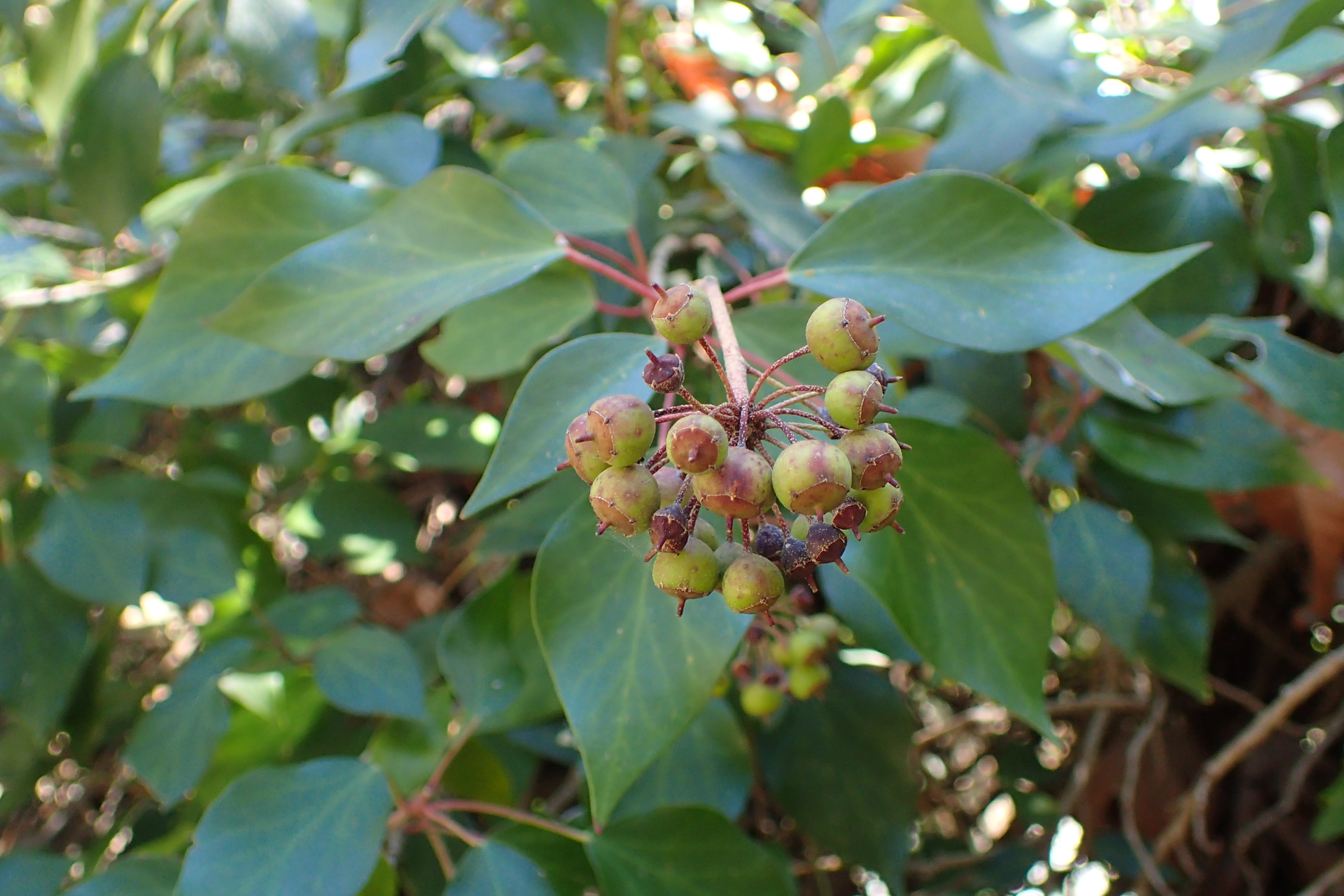

Scientific classification
- Kingdom: Plantae
- Clade: Tracheophytes
- Clade: Angiosperms
- Clade: Eudicots
- Clade: Asterids
- Order: Apiales
- Family: Araliaceae
- Genus: Hedera
- Species: H. pastuchovii

Binomial name
- Hedera pastuchovii Woronow

= Hedera pastuchovii =

Species of vine

Hedera pastuchovii, (Araliaceae) is a species of ivy native to eastern Transcaucasia and listed in The Red Book of the Azerbaijan SSR, 1989.

It is an evergreen woody climber, growing in mixed forests to 20–30 m high where suitable trees are available but failing to thrive as a groundcover plant. It climbs by means of aerial rootlets which cling to the substrate. It is commonly known as Russian ivy - so named from the formerly Russian-dominated area to which it is native.

== Description ==
Leaves are thin, glossy, light green, entire or with wavy margins, 10–12 cm x 6–9 cm, often rounded and rarely oblong-elliptic, deeply or shallowly lobed, cordate or cuneate at the base.

Hedera pastuchovii has a chromosome number of 2n= 144 (6x), making it a hexaploid. In a recent study of phylogenetics, H. pastuchovii, has been found to be related to other species of parsimony through a test of cpDNA restriction site variation analysis. In the clade containing Asian taxa, the results showed that the pre-existing phylogenies are largely congruent to one another, helping to place one additional clade helped resolve the positions of H. maroccana, H. iberica, and H. canariensis in the combined analysis.

== Distribution and habitat ==
Hedera pastuchovii rare relic species of the Greater Caucasus (Balakan, Zagatala, Gakh, Sheki and Khachmaz regions) and the Talysh (Astara, Lankaran, Masalli regions). Outside Azerbaijan - Eastern Transcaucasia, Iran. In addition to the Caucasus, H. pastuchovii is found also in the Elburz Mountains of Iran.

Hedera pastuchovii is a climbing plant that can be found on many trees or walls, as it clings up to any surface and is good for climbing or scaling any walls or trees. Its habitat includes the forests of the lowlands up to the middle mountain zone mainly on the forest edges and clearings, climbing high into trees, rather than scrambling over rocks. It is protected in the Zagatala State Reserve and Girkan reserves. A nature reserve is being set up in the Samur River delta (Khachmaz region) to protect the lowland riparian woodlands which form its preferred habitat.

== Cultivated ornamental ==
Like other Hedera species, H. pastuchovii may be used to clothe tall or wide walls for the aesthetic appeal of its foliage and to hide unsightly walls, fences and tree stumps, although, unlike some other species, its growth habit prevents its being used as ground cover. Numerous cultivars with variegated foliage and/or unusual leaf shapes have been selected for horticultural use. In cultivation in the UK the cultivar 'Ann Ala' has gained the Royal Horticultural Society's Award of Garden Merit.
