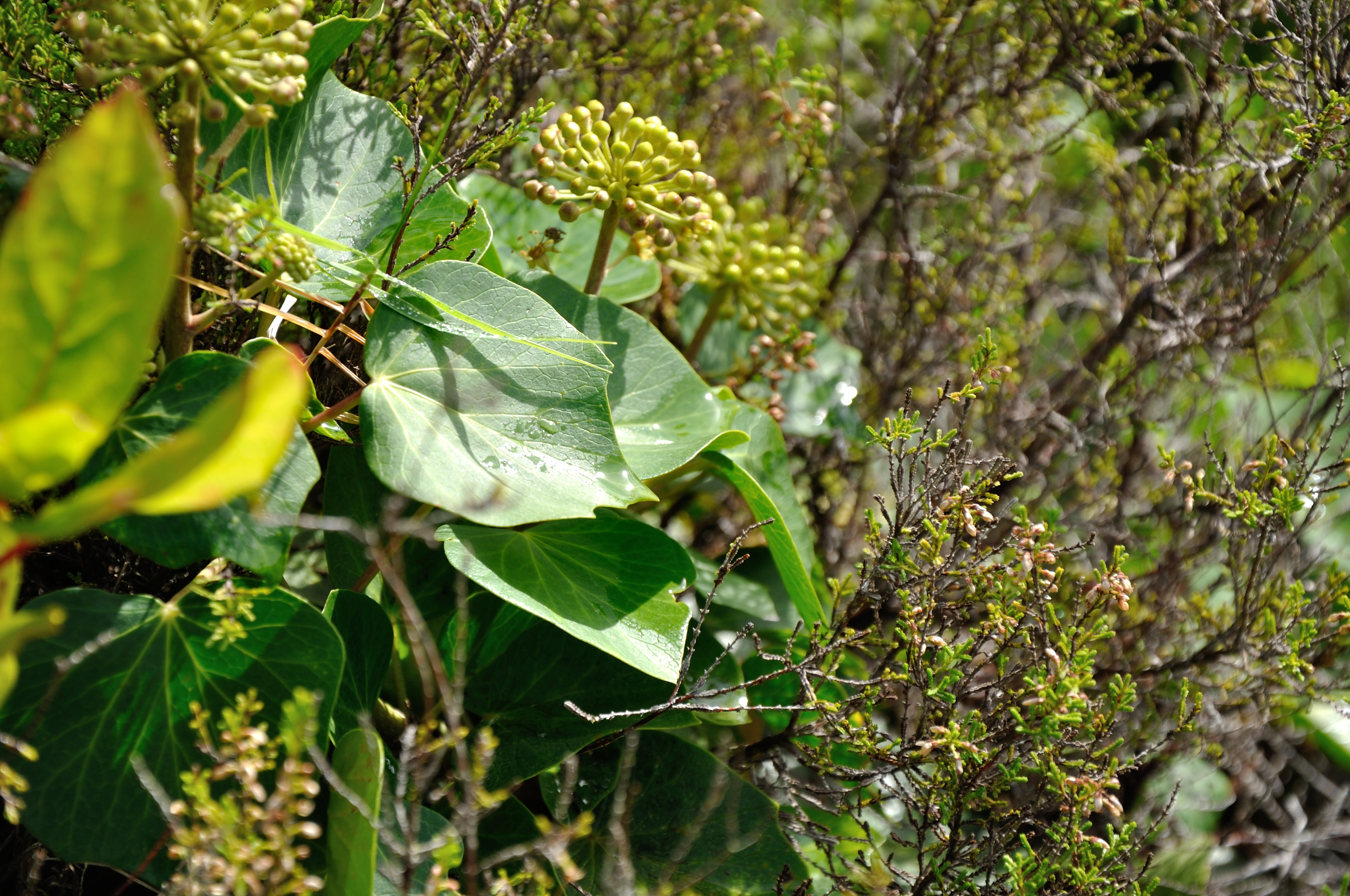

Scientific classification
- Kingdom: Plantae
- Clade: Tracheophytes
- Clade: Angiosperms
- Clade: Eudicots
- Clade: Asterids
- Order: Apiales
- Family: Araliaceae
- Genus: Hedera
- Species: H. azorica

Binomial name
- Hedera azorica Carrière

= Hedera azorica =

Species of vine

Hedera azorica, the Azores ivy, is a species of ivy (genus Hedera) which is endemic to the Azores Islands. It is an evergreen climbing plant, growing to 20–30 m high where suitable surfaces are available, and grows as ground cover where there are no vertical surfaces. It climbs by means of aerial rootlets which cling to the substrate.

== Ecology ==
The plant has an attractive and elegant aspect and is quite common in the Azores. H. azorica can be found in slopes, rock, soil and trunks of trees, especially in the laurel forest. Its natural habitat are forests or dense bushes which are cloud-covered for much of the year.

The species has great differences from island to island. Very plentiful on the rocky slopes of Lagoa do Fogo, in São Miguel. It is a woody climber shrub or perennial bush, which climbs by means of aerial rootlets which cling to the substrate. It grows 20–30 m high where suitable surfaces (trees, cliffs, walls) are available, and also grows as ground cover where there are no vertical surfaces.

Its stems are green and the leaves are large, alternate, and there are two types: palmately lobed juvenile leaves on creeping and climbing stems, and unlobed cordate adult leaves on fertile flowering stems exposed to full sun (usually high in the crowns of trees or the top of rock faces). This plant's flowers are in small umbels, tight and erect, with a long peduncle. The fruits are small, globular and black when ripe.

The plant has been cultivated in gardens and used in floral arrangements.
