= Hedera maderensis =

Scientific classification
- Kingdom: Plantae
- Clade: Tracheophytes
- Clade: Angiosperms
- Clade: Eudicots
- Clade: Asterids
- Order: Apiales
- Family: Araliaceae
- Genus: Hedera
- Species: H. maderensis

Binomial name
- Hedera maderensis K.Koch ex A.Rutherf.

Species of vine

Hedera maderensis, the Madeiran ivy, is a species of ivy (genus Hedera) which is native to the Atlantic coast in Madeira island. It is a plant of botanical family Araliaceae, species endemic to the island of Madeira with the name: Hedera maderensis (K. Koch ex A. Rutherf). Formerly a subspecies named Hedera maderensis iberica, one iberian subspecies in west Iberian peninsula was subsequently classified as a distinct species. It is quite common in Madeira and lives in slopes rock, soil, trunks of trees especially in Laurel forest of Barbusano.

It is presented as a plant shrub or bush perennial climbing, with aerial roots. Stems are green or greenish-brown, sometimes tinged with red or purple. This plant has broad leaves, 2 to 8.5 inches and a few leathery, with 1-5 lobes small, regular in size and shape.

The leaves of Hedera maderensis are small, greenish-yellow, gathered in large numbers in umbrellas, and the fruits, globular and black when ripe. This plant has flowers from April to December. Over time it was cultivated in gardens and used in floral arrangements. It is an evergreen climbing plant, growing to 20–30 m high where suitable surfaces (trees, cliffs, walls) are available, and also growing as ground cover where there are no vertical surfaces. It climbs by means of aerial rootlets which cling to the substrate.
