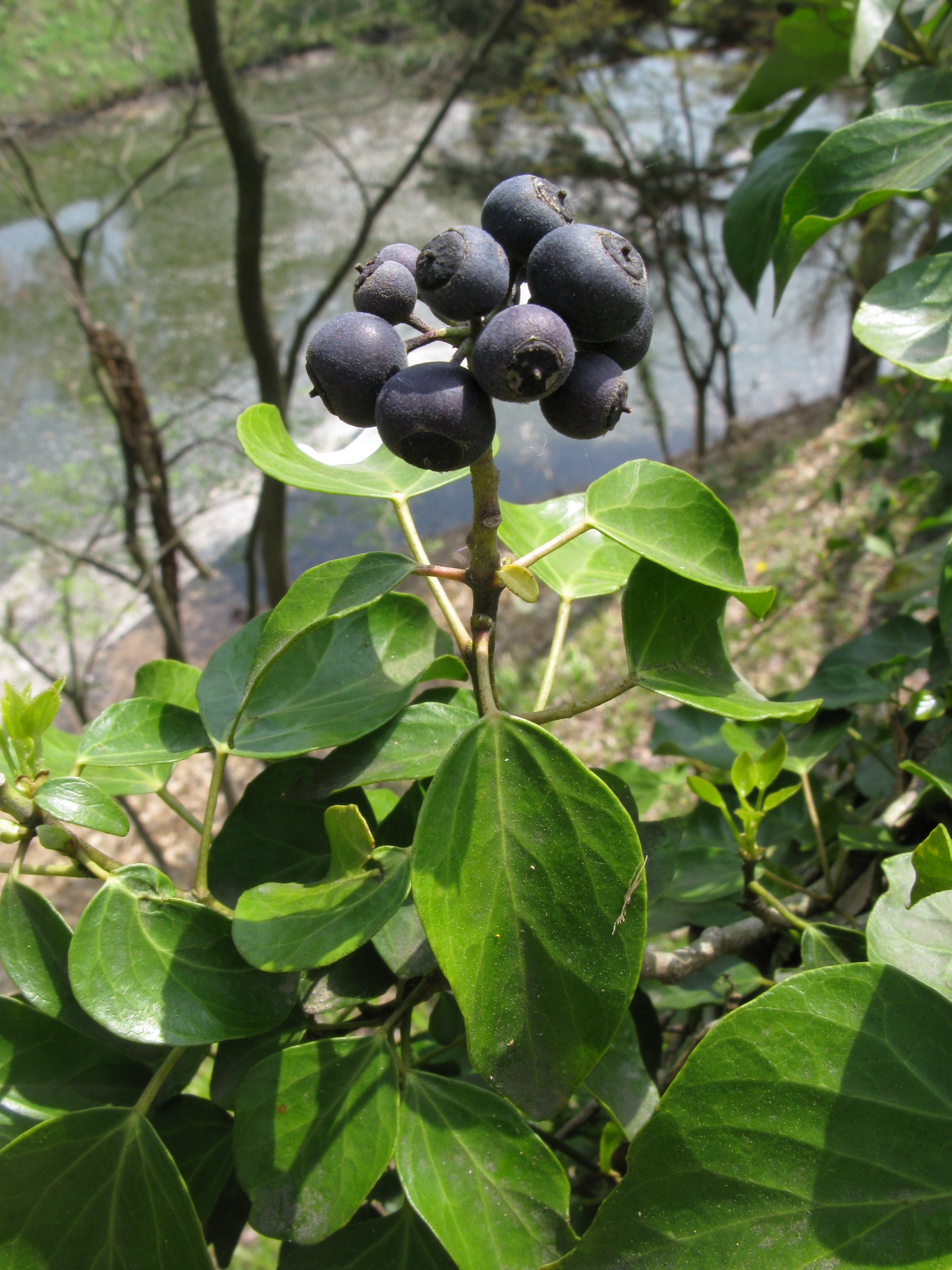

Scientific classification
- Kingdom: Plantae
- Clade: Tracheophytes
- Clade: Angiosperms
- Clade: Eudicots
- Clade: Asterids
- Order: Apiales
- Family: Araliaceae
- Genus: Hedera
- Species: H. rhombea

Binomial name
- Hedera rhombea (Miq.) Paul (1867)

Varieties
- Hedera rhombea var. formosana (Nakai) H.L.Li; Hedera rhombea var. rhombea

Synonyms
- Hedera helix var. rhombea Miq. (1863)

= Hedera rhombea =

Species of vine

Hedera rhombea, the Japanese ivy or songak, is a species of ivy in the Araliaceae family native to East Asia. It is native to Japan, the Korean Peninsula, the Ryukyu Islands, and Taiwan, where it is common on rocky slopes and growing up the trunks of trees, especially in laurel forest, a type of cloud forest.

== Description ==
It is an evergreen climbing plant, growing to 10 m high where suitable surfaces (trees, cliffs, walls) are available, and also growing as ground cover where there are no vertical surfaces. It climbs by means of aerial rootlets which cling to the substrate. Stems are green, poisonous if eaten and have an irritating sap. It is cultivated in gardens and used in floral arrangements.

The leaves are medium green and have a rhombic diamond shape that give it its species name, rhombea. Leaves have a glossy, dark green petiole. The bisexual flowers are 4–5 mm in diameter and yellow-green, in erect umbels. The round fruits are black when ripe.

== Varieties ==
Two subspecies are accepted.

- Hedera rhombea var. formosana (Nakai) H.L.Li (synonym Hedera formosana Nakai) – Taiwan
- Hedera rhombea var. rhombea (synonyms Hedera japonica Tobler, H. japonica Paul, H. pedunculata Nakai, H. rhomboidea G.W.Johnson, H. submarginata (Hibberd) Carrière, and H. tobleri Nakai) – Japan, Korea, and the Ryukyu Islands
