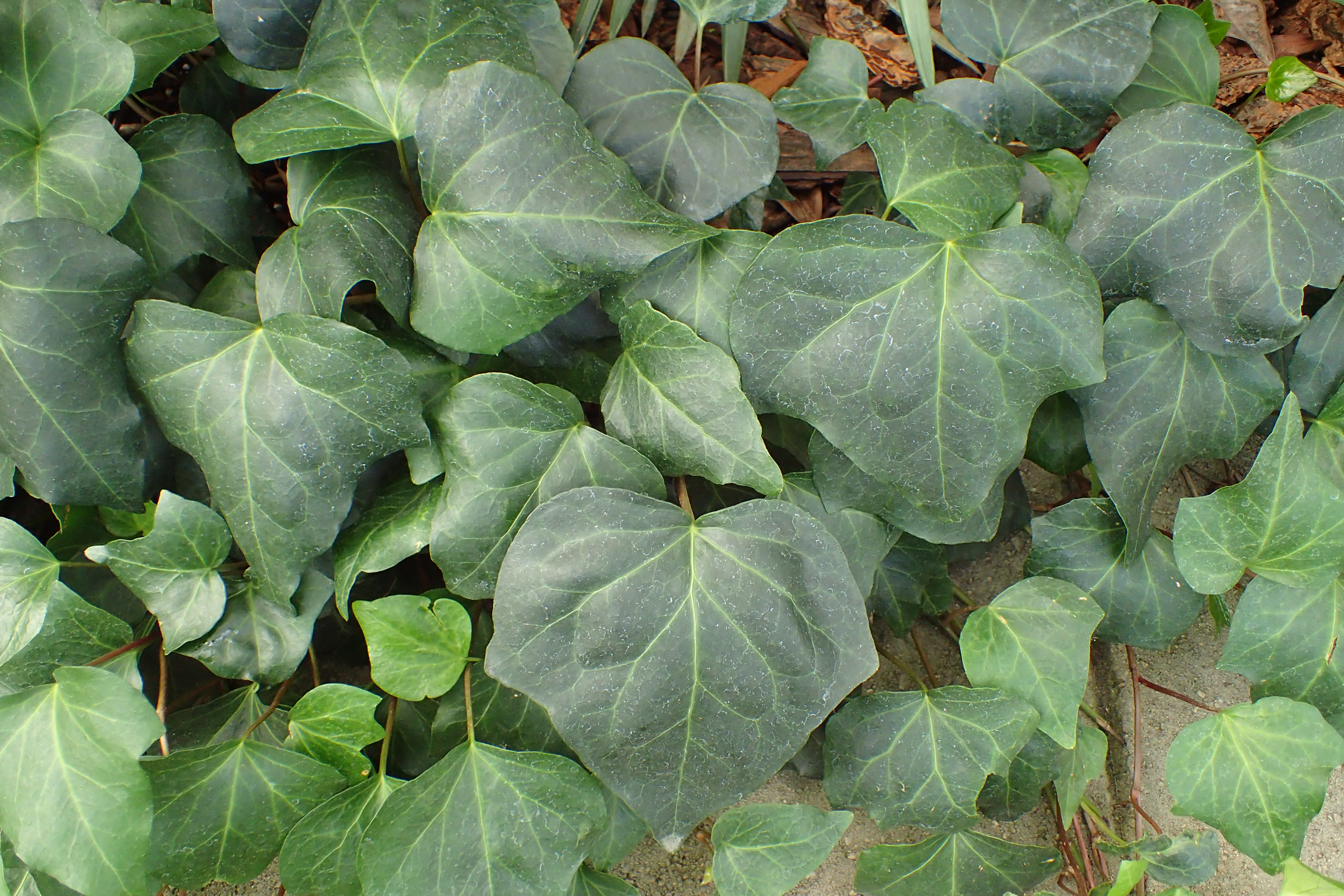
- Hedera algeriensis in Lincoln Park Conservatory, Chicago

Scientific classification
- Kingdom: Plantae
- Clade: Embryophytes
- Clade: Tracheophytes
- Clade: Angiosperms
- Clade: Eudicots
- Clade: Asterids
- Order: Apiales
- Family: Araliaceae
- Subfamily: Aralioideae
- Genus: Hedera; L.

Species
- See text

Synonyms
- Helix Mitch.; Psedera Neck.

= Hedera =

Hedera Temporal range: Oligocene–Recent

Genus of flowering plants

Hedera, commonly called ivy (plural ivies), is a genus of 12–15 species of evergreen climbing or ground-creeping woody plants in the family Araliaceae, native to Western Europe, Central Europe, Southern Europe, Macaronesia, northwestern Africa and across central-southern Asia east to Japan and Taiwan. Several species are cultivated as climbing ornamentals, and the name ivy especially denotes common ivy (Hedera helix), known in North America as "English ivy", which is frequently planted to clothe brick walls.

== Description ==
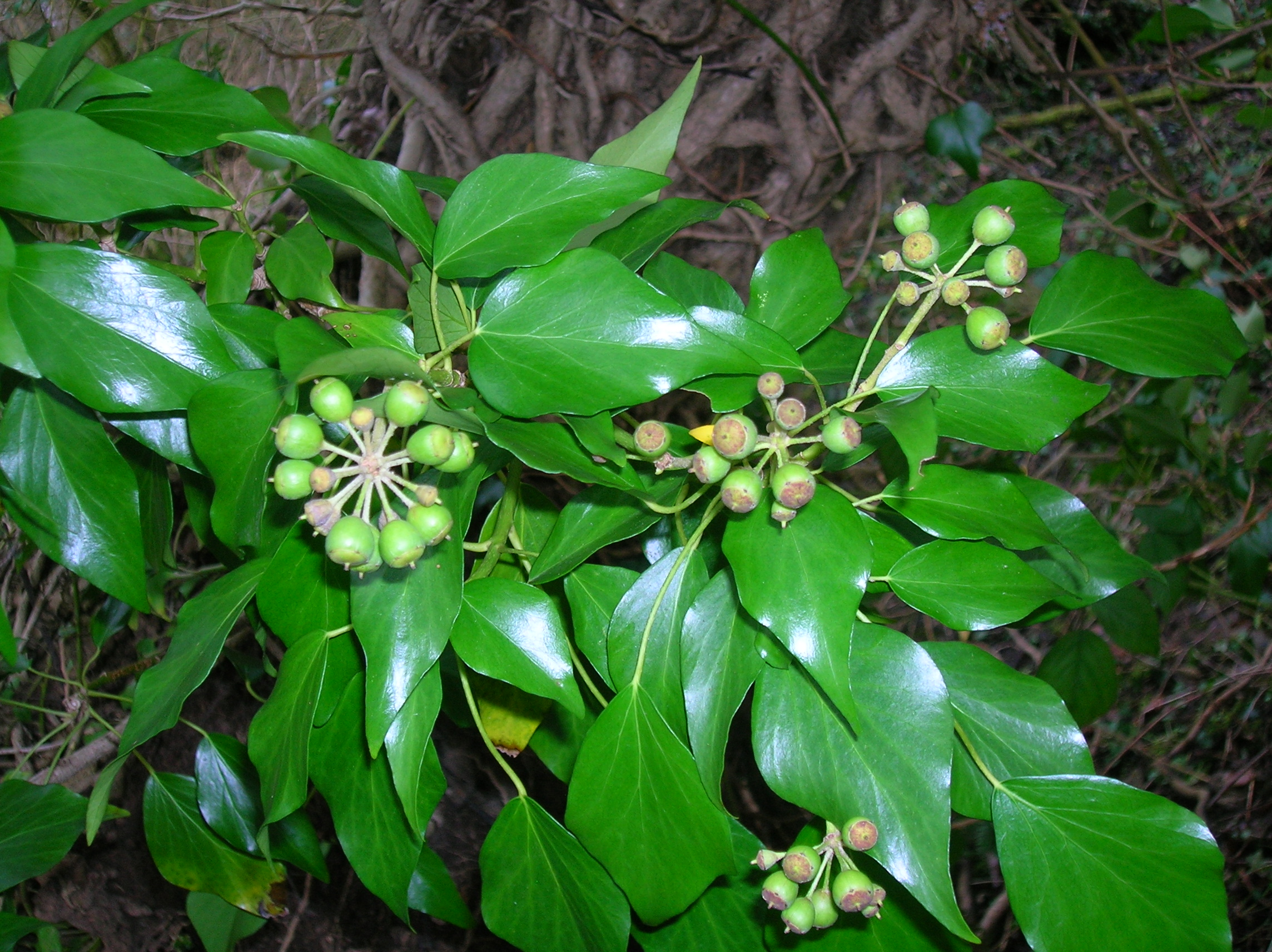
Hedera helix adult leaves and unripe berries in Ayrshire, Scotland

On level ground ivies remain creeping, not exceeding 5–20 cm (2.0–7.9 in) height, but on surfaces suitable for climbing, including trees, natural rock outcrops or man-made structures such as quarry rock faces or built masonry and wooden structures, they can climb to at least 30 m (98 ft) above the ground. Ivies have two leaf types, with palmately lobed juvenile leaves on creeping and climbing stems and unlobed cordate adult leaves on fertile flowering stems exposed to full sun, usually high in the crowns of trees or the tops of rock faces, from 2 m (6.6 ft) or more above ground. The juvenile and adult shoots also differ, the former being slender, flexible and scrambling or climbing with small aerial roots to affix the shoot to the substrate (rock or tree bark), the latter thicker, self-supporting and without roots. The flowers are greenish-yellow with five small petals; they are produced in umbels in autumn to early winter and are very rich in nectar. The fruit is a greenish-black, dark purple or (rarely) yellow berry 5–10 mm diameter with one to five seeds, ripening in late winter to mid-spring. The seeds are dispersed by birds which eat the berries.

The species differ in detail of the leaf shape and size (particularly of the juvenile leaves) and in the structure of the leaf trichomes, and also in the size and, to a lesser extent, the colour of the flowers and fruit. The chromosome number also differs between species. The basic diploid number is 48, while some are tetraploid with 96, and others hexaploid with 144 and octaploid with 192 chromosomes.

== Ecology ==
Ivies are natives of Eurasia and North Africa, but have been introduced to North America and Australia. They invade disturbed forest areas in North America. Ivy seeds are spread by birds.

Ivies are of major ecological importance for their nectar and fruit production, both produced at times of the year when few other nectar or fruit sources are available. The ivy bee Colletes hederae is completely dependent on ivy flowers, timing its entire life cycle around ivy flowering. The fruit are eaten by a range of birds, including thrushes, blackcaps, and woodpigeons. The leaves are eaten by the larvae of some species of Lepidoptera such as angle shades, lesser broad-bordered yellow underwing, scalloped hazel, small angle shades, small dusty wave (which feeds exclusively on ivy), swallow-tailed moth and willow beauty.

A very wide range of invertebrates shelter and overwinter in the dense woody tangle of ivy. Birds and small mammals also nest in ivy. It serves to increase the surface area and complexity of woodland environments.

== Taxonomy and evolution ==
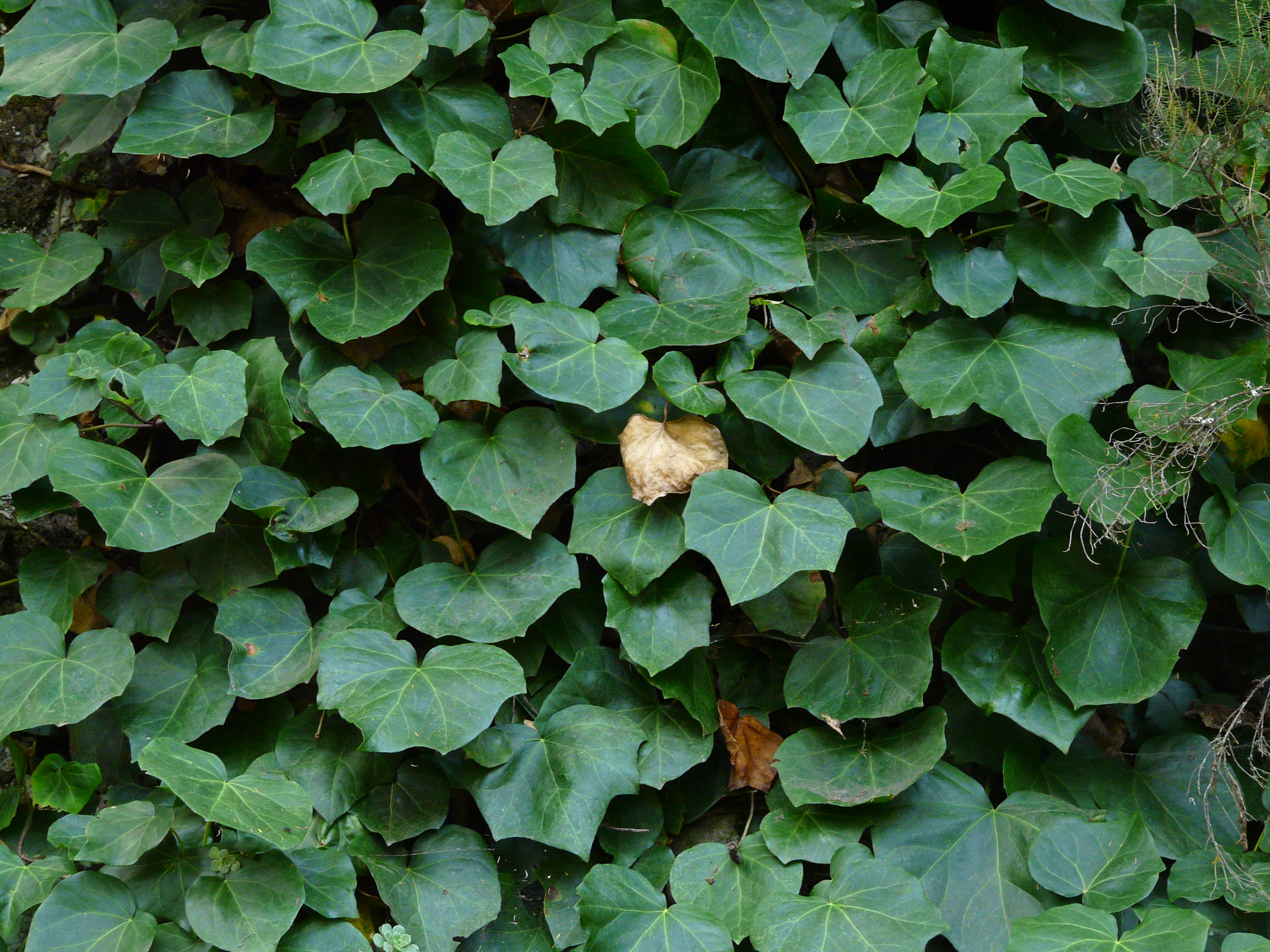
Hedera canariensis juvenile leaves, Gomera, Canary Islands

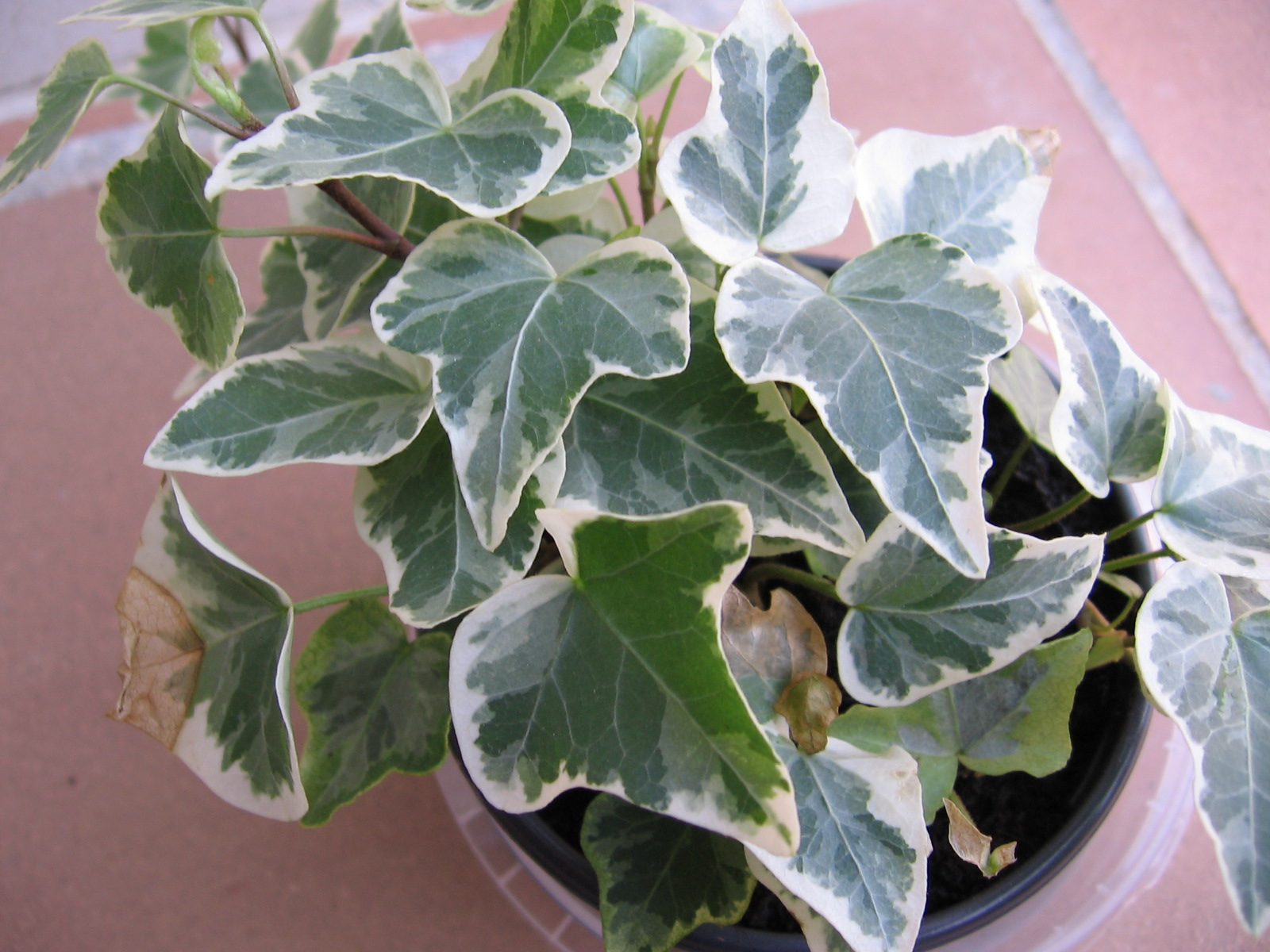
Hedera algeriensis

The following species are widely accepted; they are divided into two main groups, depending on whether they have scale-like or stellate trichomes on the undersides of the leaves:

- Trichomes scale-like
  - Hedera algeriensis Hibberd – Algerian ivy. Algeria, Tunisia (Mediterranean coast).
  - Hedera canariensis Willd. – Canaries ivy. Canary Islands.
  - Hedera colchica (K.Koch) K.Koch – Persian ivy. Alborz, Caucasus, Turkey.
  - Hedera cypria McAllister – Cyprus ivy (syn. H. pastuchovii subsp. cypria (McAll.) Hand). Cyprus (Troodos Mts.)
  - Hedera iberica (McAllister) Ackerfield & J.Wen – Iberian ivy. SW Iberian coasts.
  - Hedera maderensis – Madeiran ivy. Madeira.
  - Hedera maroccana McAllister – Moroccan ivy. Morocco.
  - Hedera nepalensis K.Koch – Himalayan ivy (syn. H. sinensis (Tobl.) Hand.-Mazz.). Himalaya, SW China.
  - Hedera pastuchovii G.Woronow – Pastuchov's ivy. Caucasus, Alborz.
  - Hedera rhombea (Miq.) Siebold ex Bean – Japanese ivy. Japan, Korea, Taiwan.
- Trichomes stellate
  - Hedera azorica Carrière – Azores ivy. Azores.
  - Hedera crebrescens M. Bényei-Himmer et M. Höhn - Buda ivy. Central Europe
  - Hedera helix L. – Common ivy (syn. H. caucasigena Pojark., H. taurica (Hibberd) Carrière). Europe, and widely introduced elsewhere.
  - Hedera hibernica (G.Kirchn.) Bean – Atlantic ivy (syn. H. helix subsp. hibernica (G.Kirchn.) D.C.McClint.). Atlantic western Europe.

The species of ivy are largely allopatric and closely related, and many have on occasion been treated as varieties or subspecies of H. helix, the first species described. Several additional species have been described in the southern parts of the former Soviet Union, but are not regarded as distinct by most botanists.

Hybrids have been recorded between several Hedera species, including Atlantic ivy (H. hibernica) with common ivy (H. helix). Hybridisation may also have played a part in the evolution of some species in the genus. A well-known hybrid involving ivies is the intergeneric hybrid × Fatshedera lizei, a cross between Fatsia japonica and Hedera hibernica. This hybrid was produced once in a garden in France in 1910 and has never successfully been repeated, the hybrid being maintained in cultivation by vegetative propagation.

=== Evolution ===
The genus is thought to have originated in East Asia, with the earliest fossil of the genus being known from Korea, dating to the Oligocene epoch. The genus later expanded westwards, reaching Europe during the early-middle Miocene epoch.

== Uses and cultivation ==
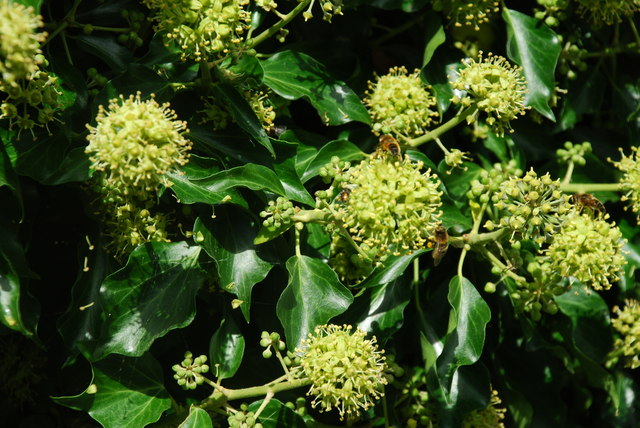
When the ivy blooms in September it attracts hoverflies and other nectar feeders.

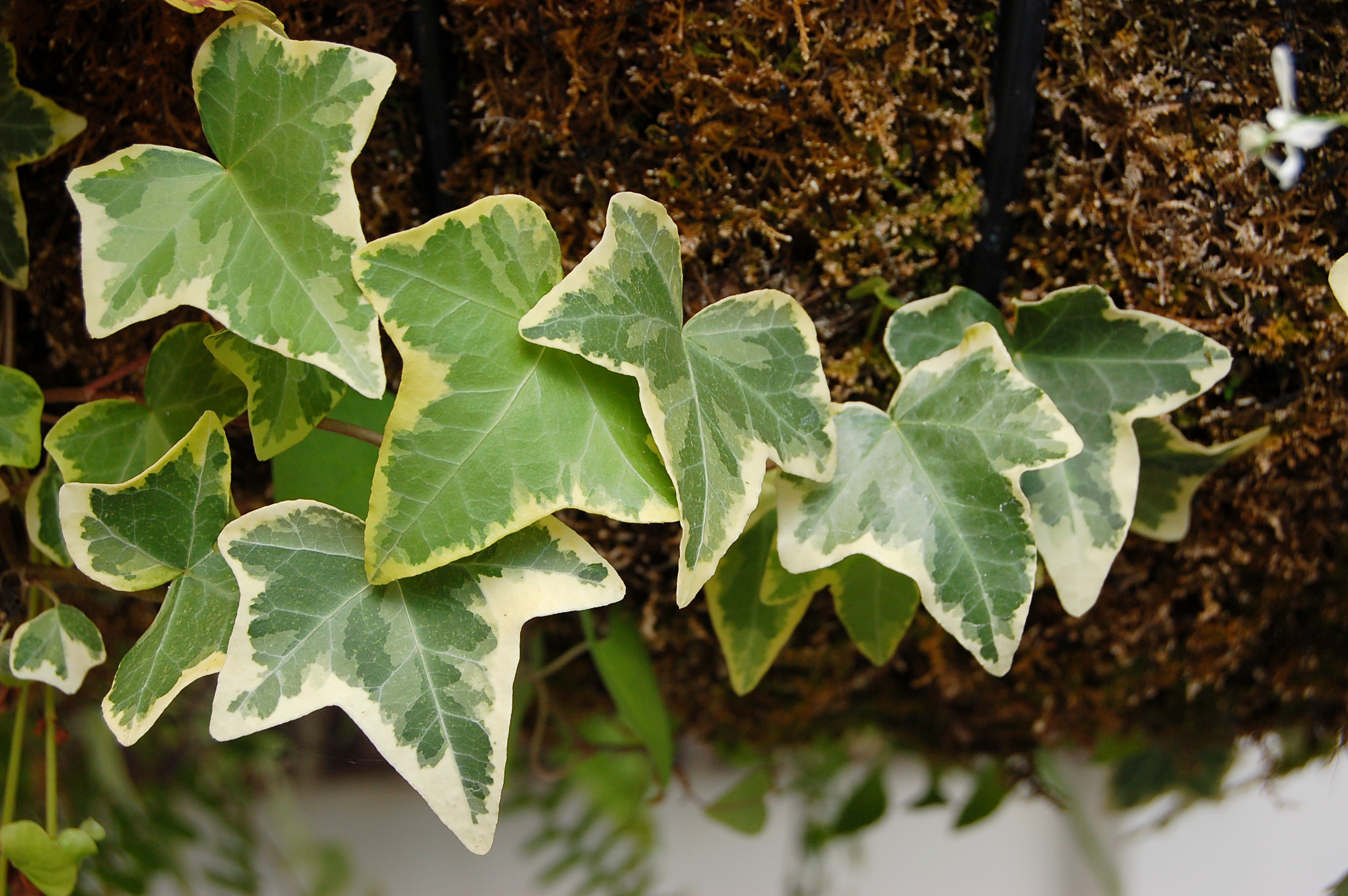
A variegated Hedera helix cultivar

Ivies are very popular in cultivation within their native range and compatible climates elsewhere, for their evergreen foliage, attracting wildlife, and for adaptable design uses in narrow planting spaces and on tall or wide walls for aesthetic addition, or to hide unsightly walls, fences and tree stumps. Numerous cultivars with variegated foliage and/or unusual leaf shapes have been selected for horticultural use.

The American Ivy Society is the International Cultivar Registration Authority for Hedera, and recognises over 400 registered cultivars.

== Problems and dangers ==
=== On trees ===
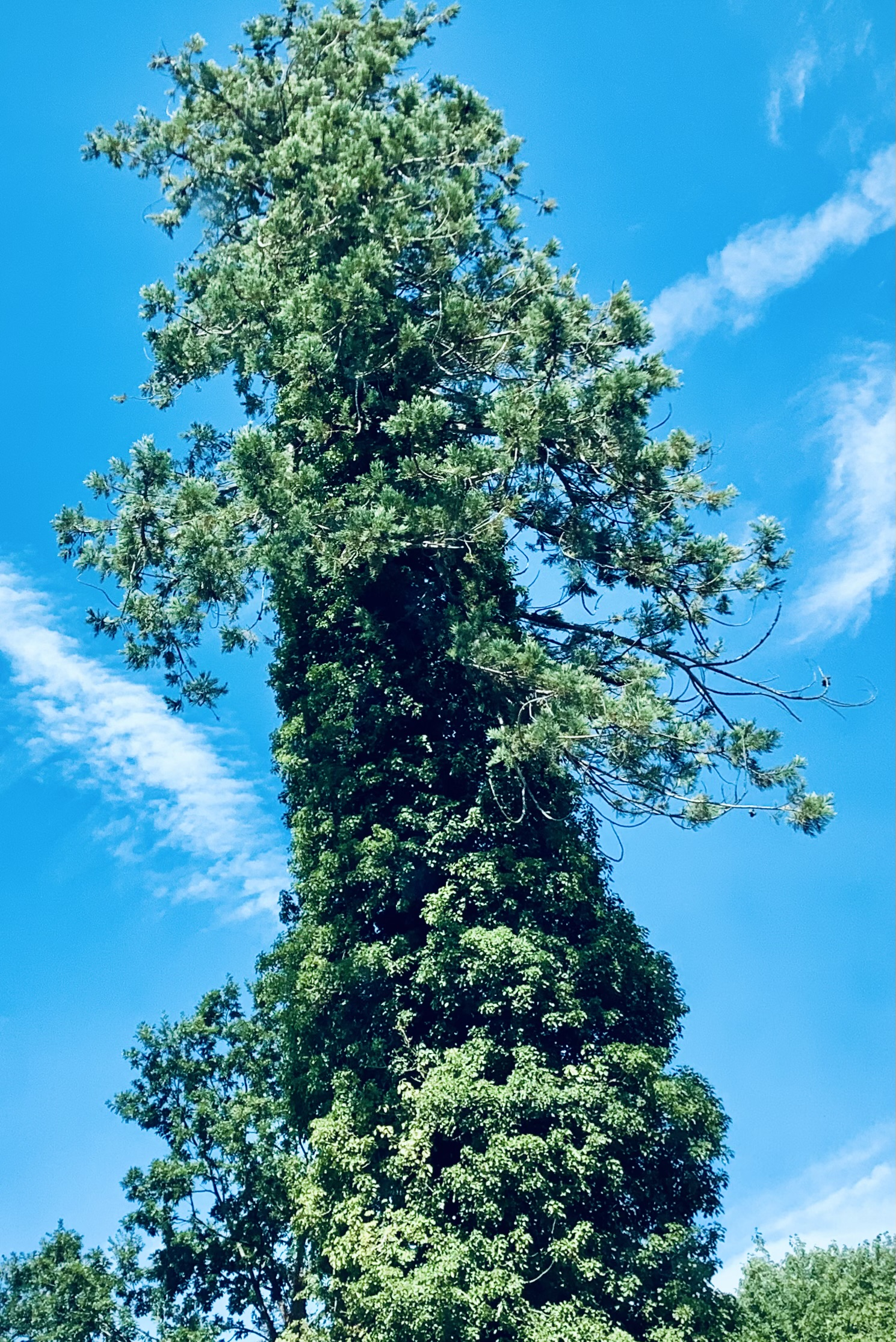
Ivy climbing on a pine tree (Pinus sylvestris) in Headley, UK

Much discussion has involved whether or not ivy harms the trees it climbs. In Europe, the harm is generally minor although there can be competition for soil nutrients, light, and water, and senescent trees supporting heavy ivy growth can be liable to windthrow damage. The UK's Woodland Trust says "Ivy has long been accused of strangling trees, but it doesn't harm the tree at all, and even supports at least 50 species of wildlife." Harm and problems are more significant in North America, where ivy is without the natural pests and diseases that control its vigour in its native continents; the photosynthesis or structural strength of a tree can be overwhelmed by aggressive ivy growth leading to death directly or by opportunistic disease and insect attacks.

=== Invasive exotic ===
Several ivy species have become a serious invasive species (invasive exotic) in natural native plant habitats, especially riparian and woodland types, and also a horticultural weed in gardens of the western and southern regions of North America with milder winters. Ivies create a dense, vigorously smothering, shade-tolerant evergreen groundcover that can spread through assertive underground rhizomes and above-ground runners quickly over large natural plant community areas and outcompete the native vegetation. The use of ivies as ornamental plants in horticulture in California and other states is now discouraged or banned in certain jurisdictions. Drought-tolerant H. canariensis and H. algeriensis and European H. helix were originally cultivated in garden, park, and highway landscaping, but they have become aggressively invasive in coastal forests and riparian ecosystems, now necessitating costly eradication programs. Similar problems exist in Australia. Only one species of ivy, H. helix, bears the status of 'declared weed' in Australia; in the Australian Capital Territory, and Western Australia only.

=== Toxicity ===
The berries are moderately toxic to humans. Ivy foliage contains triterpenoid saponins and falcarinol. Falcarinol is capable of inducing contact dermatitis. It has also been shown to kill breast cancer cells.

=== Stinging insects ===
The flowers of ivy are pollinated by Hymenoptera and are particularly attractive to the common wasp.

== Etymology and other names ==
The name ivy derives from Old English ifig, cognate with German Efeu, of unknown original meaning. The scientific name Hedera is the classical Latin name for the plant. Old regional common names in Britain, no longer used, include "Bindwood" and "Lovestone", for the way it clings and grows over stones and bricks. US Pacific Coast regional common names for H. canariensis include "California ivy" and "Algerian ivy". For H. helix, regional common names include "common ivy" (Britain and Ireland) and "English ivy" (North America).

The name ivy has also been used as a common name for a number of other unrelated plants, including Boston ivy (Japanese creeper Parthenocissus tricuspidata, in the family Vitaceae), Cape-ivy (used interchangeably for Senecio angulatus and Delairea odorata, Asteraceae), poison-ivy (Toxicodendron radicans, Anacardiaceae), Swedish ivy (whorled plectranthus Plectranthus verticillatus, Lamiaceae) and ground ivy (Glechoma hederacea, also Lamiaceae), and Kenilworth ivy (Cymbalaria muralis, Plantaginaceae).

== Cultural symbolism ==
In Ancient Rome it was believed that a wreath of ivy could prevent a person from becoming drunk, and such a wreath was worn by Bacchus, the god of intoxication.

Ivy bushes or ivy-wrapped poles have traditionally been used to advertise taverns in the United Kingdom, and many pubs are still called The Ivy.

Ivy's clinging nature makes it a symbol of love and friendship. There was once a tradition of priests giving ivy to newlyweds.

In medieval Christianity, it symbolized the soul's eternal life after death, because it clings to dead trees and remains green.

The traditional British Christmas carol, "The Holly and the Ivy", uses ivy as a symbol for the Virgin Mary.

Ivy-covered ruins were a staple of the Romantic movement in landscape painting, for example Visitor to a Moonlit Churchyard by Philip James de Loutherbourg (1790), Tintern Abbey, West Front by Joseph Mallord William Turner (1794) and Netley Abbey by Francis Towne (1809). In this context, ivy may represent the ephemerality of human endeavours and the sublime power of nature.

The image of ivy-covered historic buildings gave the name Ivy League to a group of old and prestigious American universities.

Ivy features extensively in the 2010 movie Arrietty and the poster for the film.

== Gallery ==
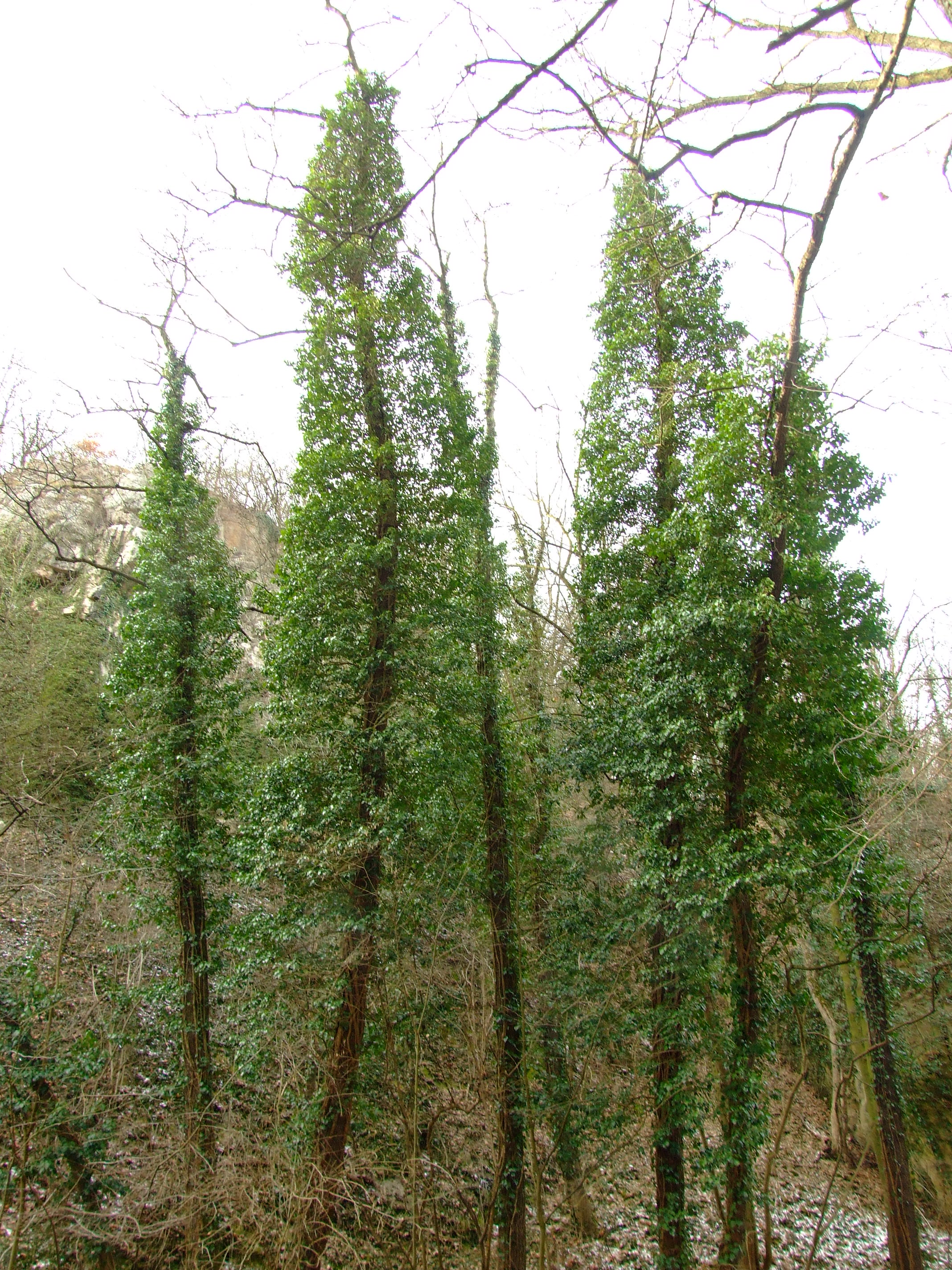
Hedera helix on trees near Srbsko, Czech Republic

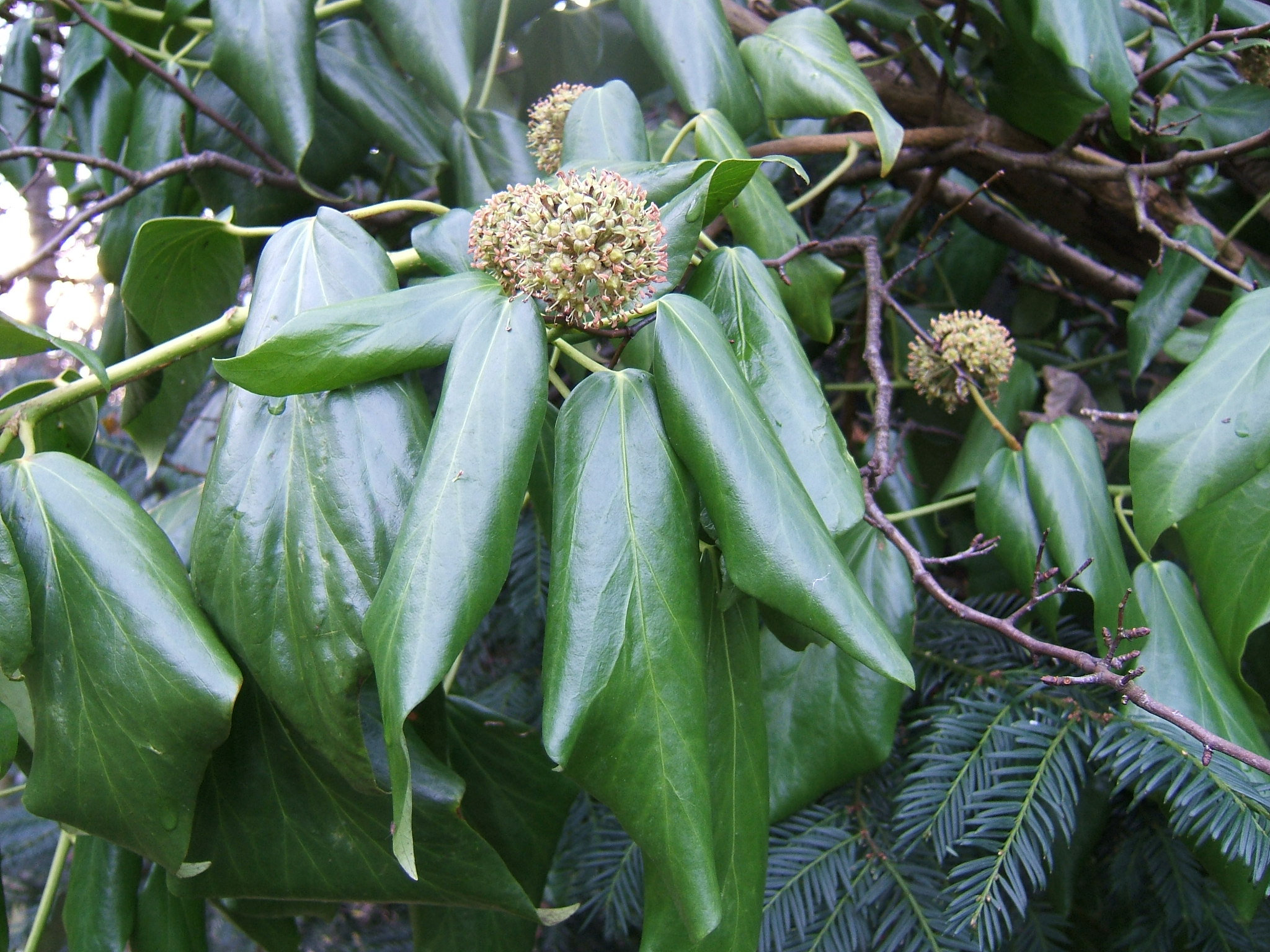
Hedera colchica leaves and flowers

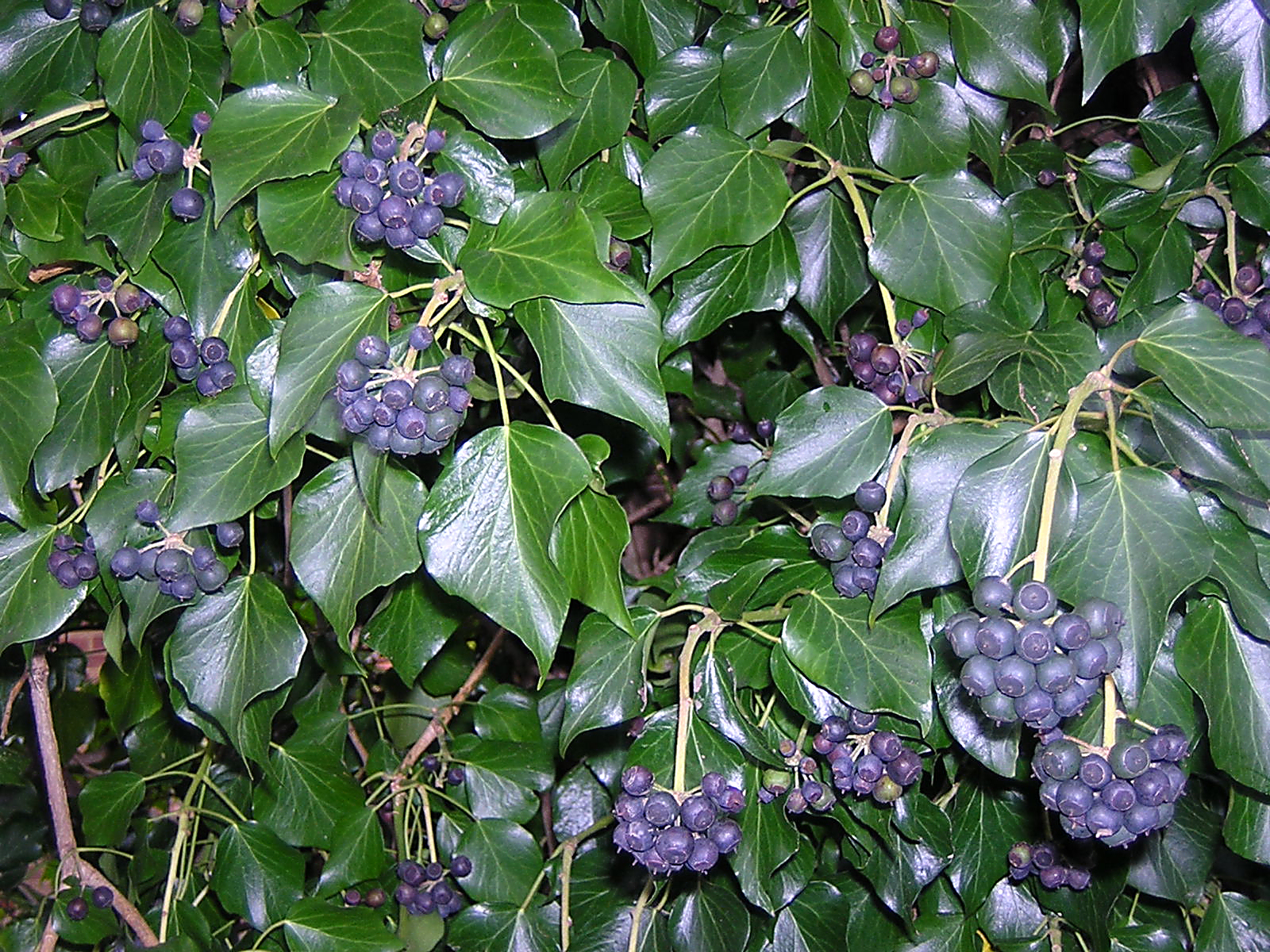
Hedera hibernica with berries

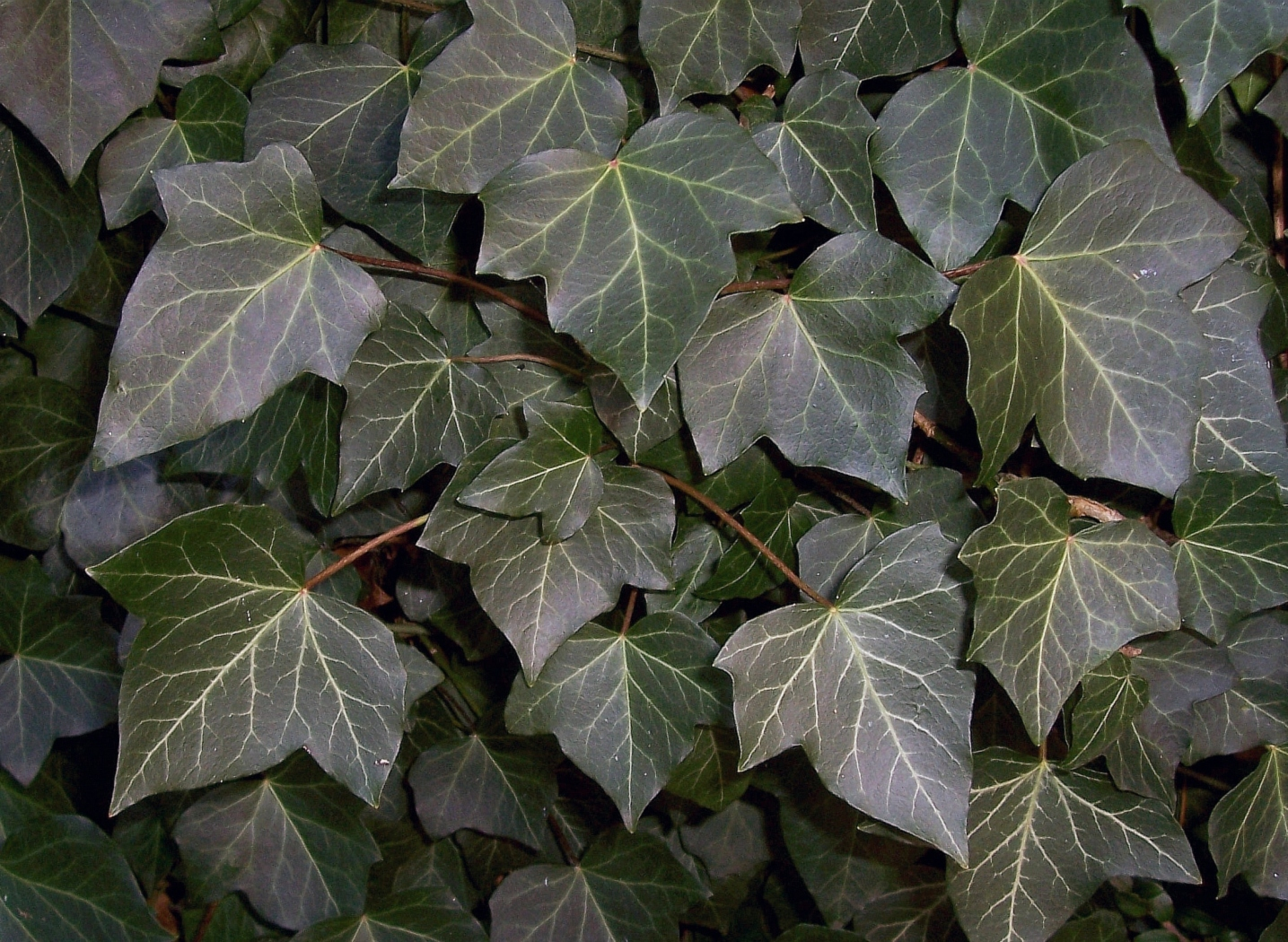
Hedera helix leaves, Bremerhaven

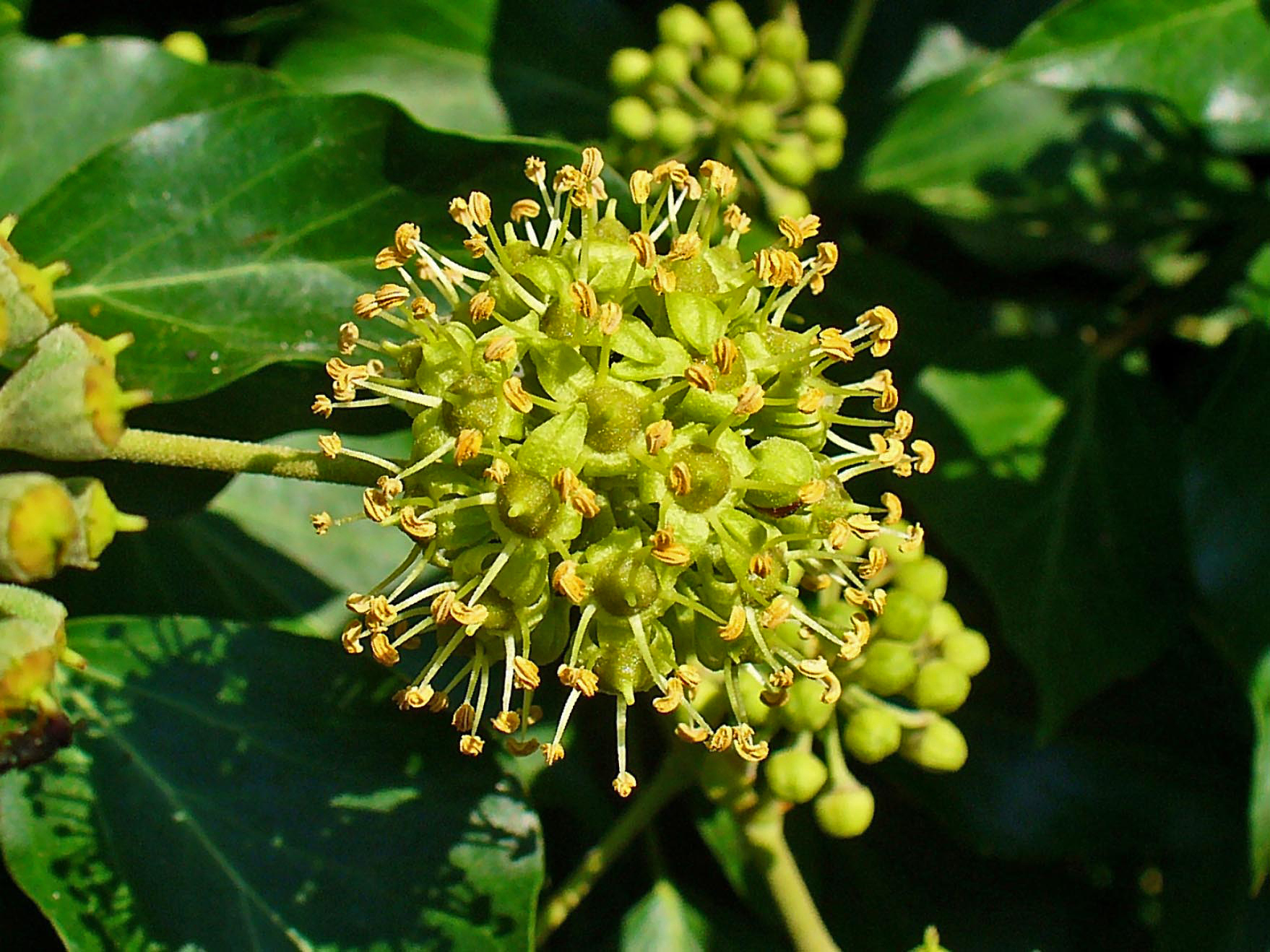
Hedera helix flowers

== See also ==
- Anjo Festival
- Bığbığ Ivy
- List of poisonous plants
- NASA Clean Air Study
