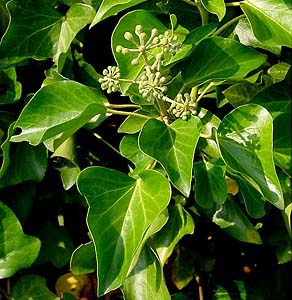
- Hedera hibernica shoot with flower buds

Scientific classification
- Kingdom: Plantae
- Clade: Tracheophytes
- Clade: Angiosperms
- Clade: Eudicots
- Clade: Asterids
- Order: Apiales
- Family: Araliaceae
- Genus: Hedera
- Species: H. hibernica

Binomial name
- Hedera hibernica Poit.

Synonyms
- List: Hedera canariensis var. maculata (Hibberd) Hibberd; Hedera grandifolia var. maculata Hibberd; Hedera helix var. hibernica G.Kirchn.; Hedera helix subsp. hibernica (G.Kirchn.) D.C.McClint.; Hedera helix f. maculata (Hibberd) Tobler; Hedera helix var. maculata (Hibberd) Rehder; Hedera hibernica (G.Kirchn.) Bean; Hedera vegeta G.Nicholson; Hedera vitifolia G.Nicholson

= Hedera hibernica =

Species of vine

Hedera hibernica, the Atlantic ivy or Irish ivy, is a species of ivy native to the Atlantic coast of Europe.

== Description ==
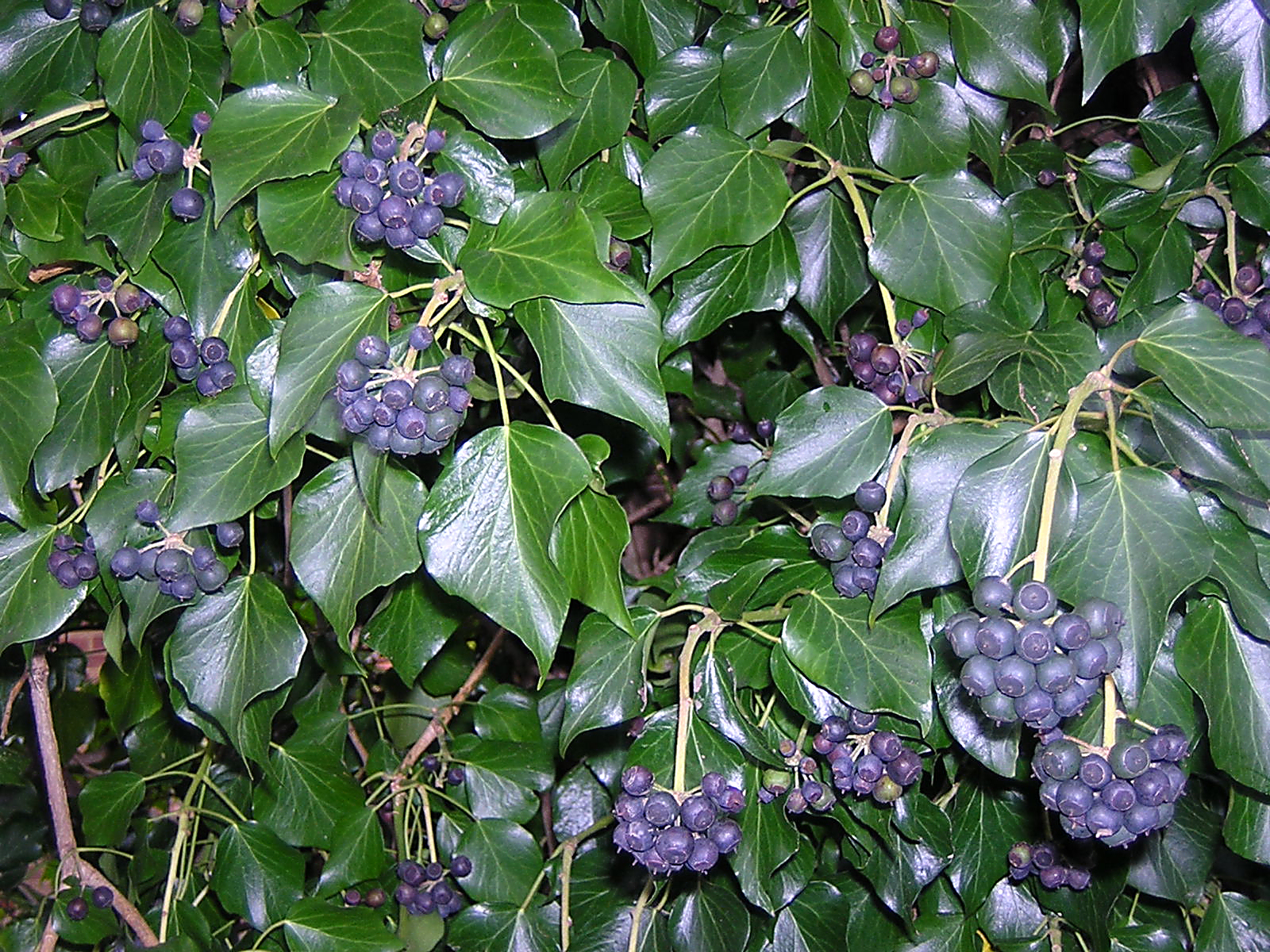
Hedera hibernica with berries, Hertfordshire, UK, February

It is an evergreen climbing plant, growing to 20–30 m high where suitable surfaces (trees, cliffs, walls) are available, and also growing as ground cover where there are no vertical surfaces. It climbs by means of aerial rootlets which cling to the substrate. One way in which it differs from Hedera helix (common ivy) is that the light veins on its leaves are less pronounced.

The bark is first green, but soon after it becomes gray. Old branches are light gray with a finely furrowed bark. Buds are almost hidden by the leaf base, egg-shaped and bright green. The leaves have entire margins and are ovoid or with five triangular lobes. The surface is glossy dark green with light ribs, while the underside is pale green. The leaves of flowering shoots are, however, oval with entire margins. Flowering occurs in September–October. The fruits are blue-black berries. The whole plant and also the berries are slightly poisonous.

== Cultivation ==
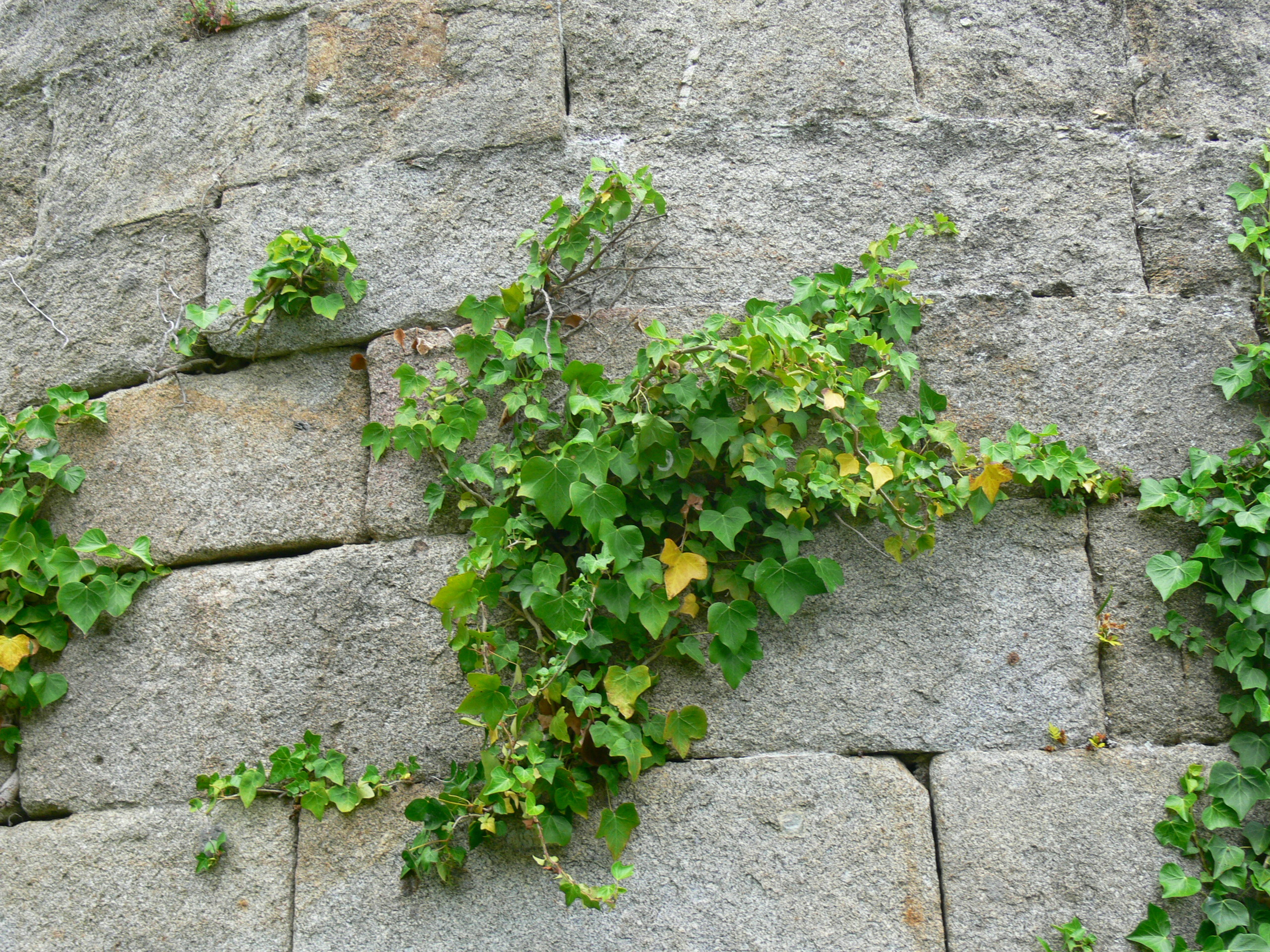
Growing within a wall at the island of Elba, Italy

Native to the Atlantic region, it has been cultivated and can appear in the wild outside its original area, along the Atlantic coast from Portugal, Spain, France, Ireland, Great Britain, Germany, Scandinavia and the Baltic Sea. The plant has an attractive and elegant aspect. It is quite common in gardening, and has gained the Royal Horticultural Society's Award of Garden Merit.

Like the related H. helix (English ivy), H. hibernica is an invasive weed in parts of North America with mild winters: in a recent study, 83% of 119 populations of invasive ivy sampled in the Pacific Northwest were found to be H. hibernica and not H. helix as was previously thought. In fact it can be troublesome in any garden, rapidly colonising hedges, trees and borders if not kept in check.

== Ecology ==
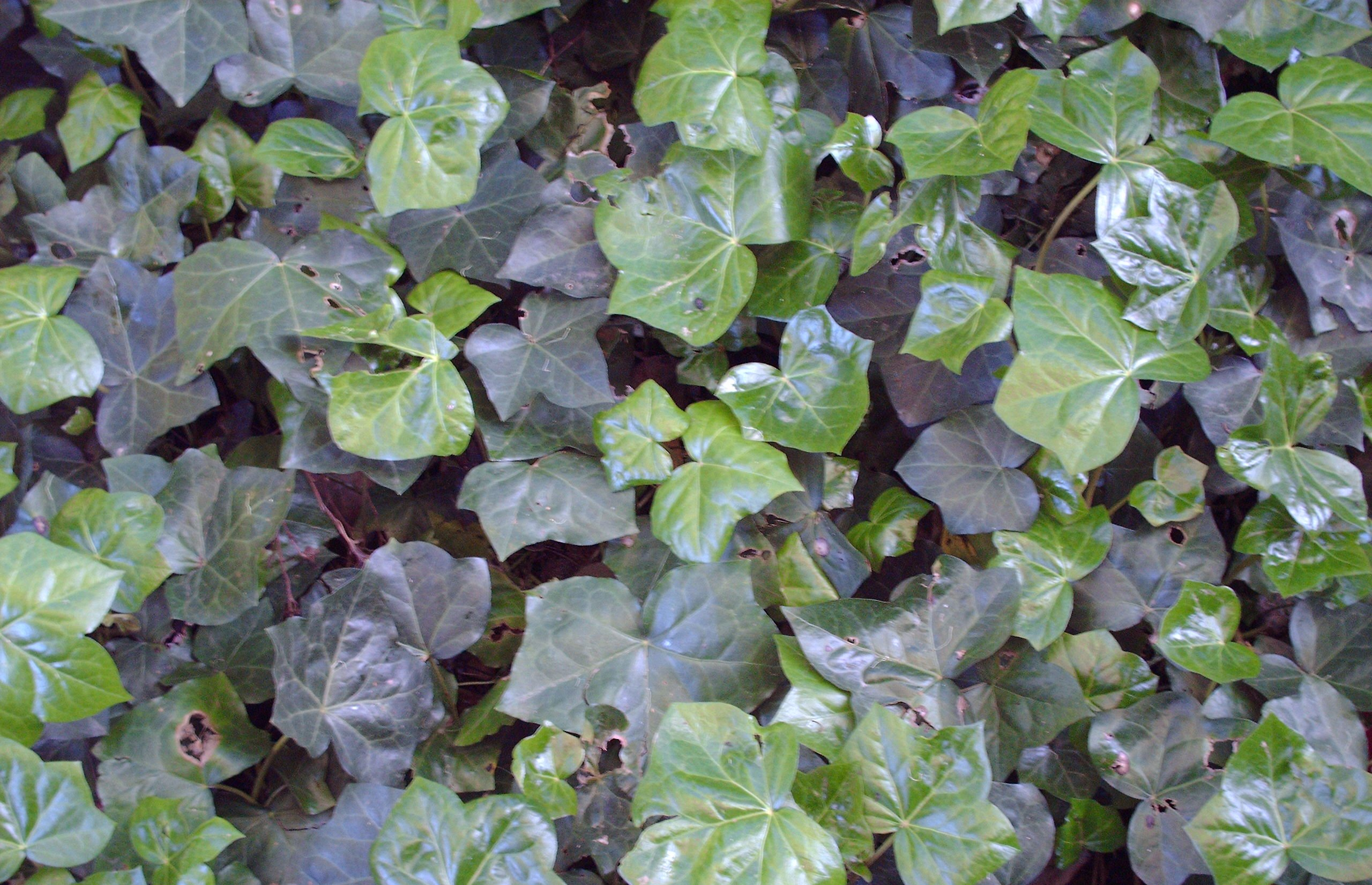
Growing as a groundcover on Mount Dandenong, Victoria, Australia

It requires consistently moist soil, and can grow in any light environment from full sun to deep shade. Its natural habitat is forest or dense bush which is cool and cloud-covered for much of the year, such as is often found in mountainous regions near the ocean. It prefers well-drained or alkaline soils rich in nutrients and humus. In areas to which it has been introduced it may be a noxious weed or be invasive.

In the autumn its flowers are an important source of nectar for many insects, including the ivy bee Colletes hederae. The berries are a source of winter food for Common wood pigeons, thrushes, Common blackbirds and the Eurasian Blackcap. Some species of small bird use the niches it provides as nest sites.
