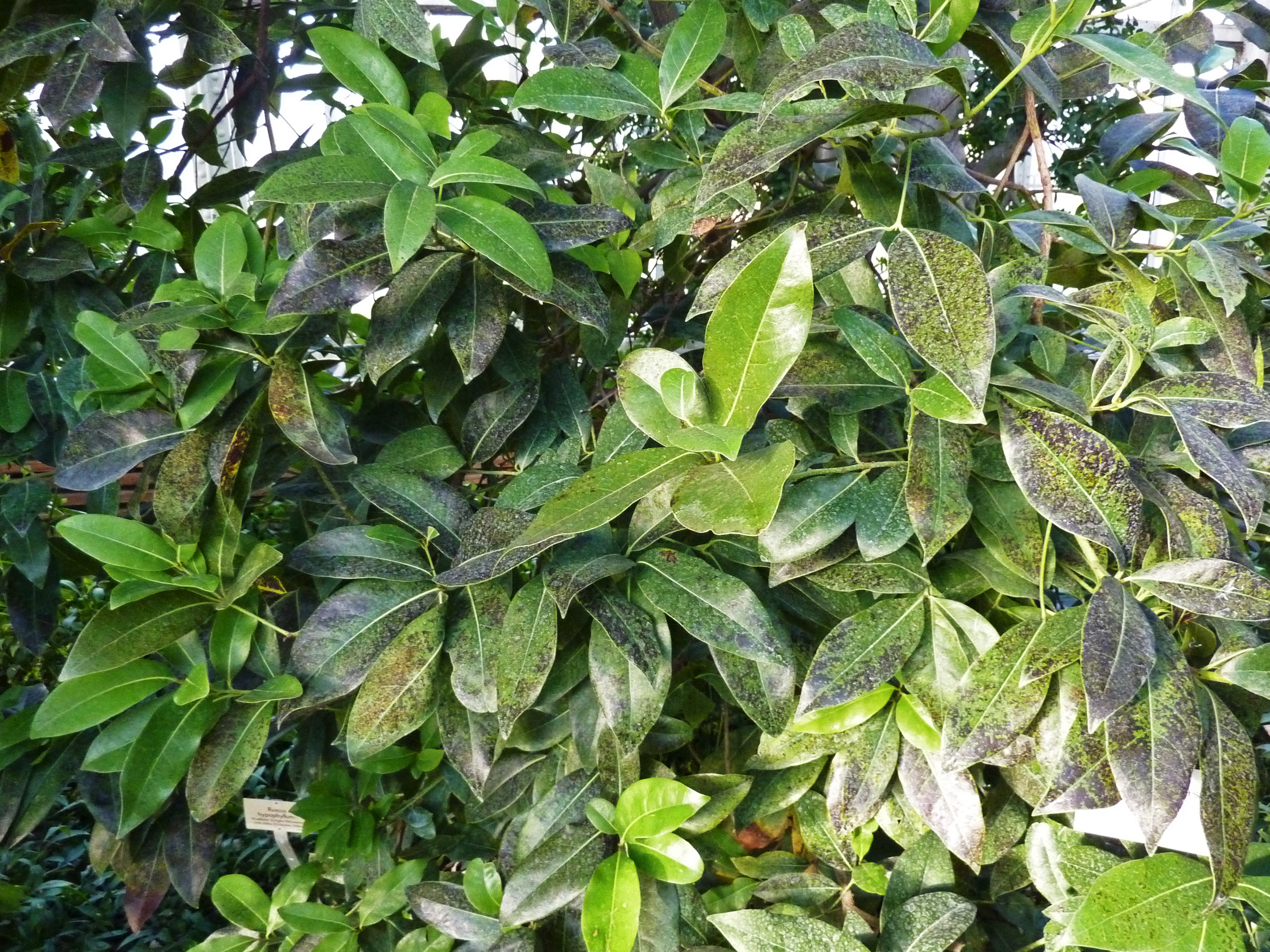
- Apollonias barbujana, Canary Islands

Scientific classification
- Kingdom: Plantae
- Clade: Tracheophytes
- Clade: Angiosperms
- Clade: Magnoliids
- Order: Laurales
- Family: Lauraceae
- Genus: Apollonias; Nees

Species
- See text

= Apollonias =

Genus of flowering plants

Apollonias is a genus of flowering plants belonging to the laurel family, Lauraceae. The genus includes from zero to 10 species of evergreen trees and shrubs, depending on circumscription. Recent studies transferred the majority of species to Beilschmiedia. A recent phylogenetic study found that Apollonias barbujana, native to the Canary Islands and Madeira, is nested in genus Persea, and has been renamed Persea barbujana. Apollonias arnottii, which is endemic to the Western Ghats of India, is considered an unplaced taxon by Plants of the World Online.

== Species ==
- A. arnottii Nees (unplaced) – Western Ghats
- A. barbujana (Cav.) A.Braun (syn. A. canariensis (Willd.) Nees; accepted as Persea barbujana (Cav.) Mabb. & Nieto Fel.) – Canary laurel, barbusano; Canary Islands and Madeira
- A. grandiflora Kosterm. (accepted as Beilschmiedia velutina (Kosterm.) Kosterm.) – Madagascar
- A. madagascariensis (Baill.) Kosterm. (accepted as Beilschmiedia madagascariensis (Baill.) Kosterm.) – Madagascar
- A. microphylla Kosterm. (accepted as Beilschmiedia microphylla (Kosterm.) Kosterm.) – Madagascar
- A. oppositifolia Kosterm. (accepted as Beilschmiedia opposita Kosterm.) – voakoromanga; Madagascar
- A. sericea Kosterm. (accepted as Beilschmiedia sericans Kosterm.) – Madagascar
- A. velutina Kosterm. (accepted as B. velutina (Kosterm.) Kosterm.) – Madagascar
- A. zeylanica (accepted as Beilschmiedia wightii (Nees) Benth. ex Hook.f.) – southern India and Sri Lanka
