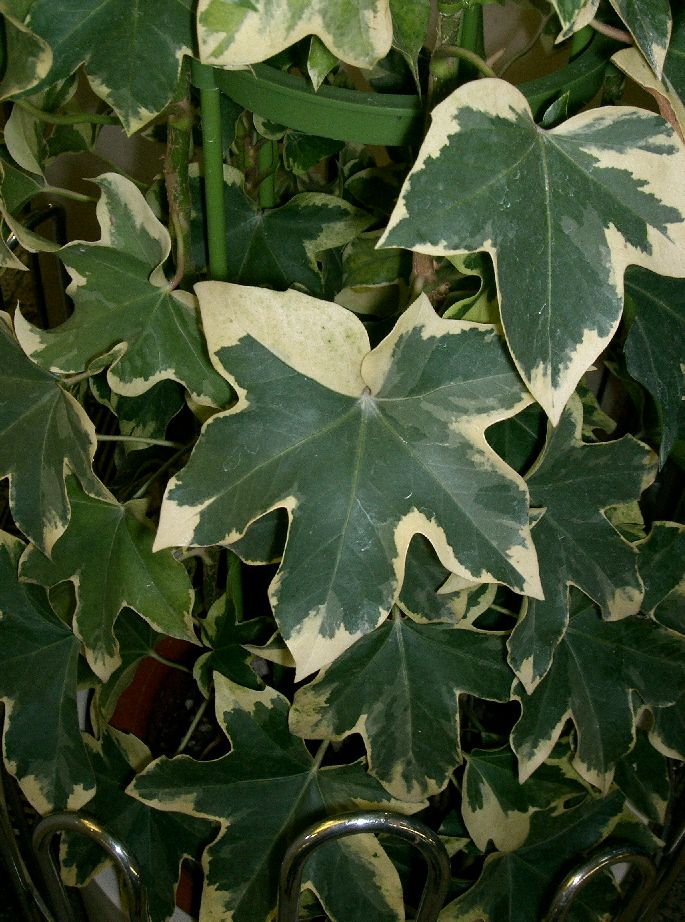

Scientific classification
- Kingdom: Plantae
- Clade: Embryophytes
- Clade: Tracheophytes
- Clade: Angiosperms
- Clade: Eudicots
- Clade: Asterids
- Order: Apiales
- Family: Araliaceae
- Genus: × Fatshedera; Guillaumin
- Species: × F. lizei

Binomial name
- × Fatshedera lizei (hort. ex Cochet) Guillaumin

Synonyms
- Aralia × lizei Cochet

= × Fatshedera =

Hybrid genus of flowering plants

× Fatshedera /fætsˈhɛdərə/ is a hybrid genus of flowering plants, common name tree ivy or aralia ivy. It has only one species, × Fatshedera lizei. The hybrid symbol × in front of the name indicates that this is an inter-generic hybrid, a cross between plants from different genera. The name may be displayed with or without a space after the × symbol.

× Fatshedera lizei was created by crossing Fatsia japonica 'Moserii' (Moser's Japanese fatsia, the seed parent) and Hedera helix (common ivy, the pollen parent) at the Lizé Frères tree nursery at Nantes in France in 1912. Its generic name is derived from the names of the two parent genera.

== Description ==
The plant combines the shrubby shape of Fatsia with the five-lobed leaves of Hedera. As a shrub, × F. lizei can grow up to 1.2 m (3.9 ft) tall, above which the weight of the fairly weak branches makes them tend to bend over. It can, however, also be tied to a support and grow into a vine up to 3–4 m (9.8–13.1 ft) tall; unlike Hedera, it does not readily climb without assistance. The leaf blades are 7–25 cm (2.8–9.8 in) long and broad, with a 5–20 cm (2.0–7.9 in) petiole. The flowers are 4–6 mm in diameter, yellowish-white, produced in late autumn or early winter in dense umbels; they are usually sterile and do not produce any fruit. However, specimens have been reported which did produce not only flowers but also clusters of berries, one of which put forth shoots in the pot.

== Taxonomy ==
It was first described as Aralia × lizei Cochet by Pierre Charles Marie Cochet in 1912. It was later transferred to its own hybrid genus × Fatshedera Guillaumin as × Fatshedera lizei (Cochet) Guillaumin by André Guillaumin in 1923. It is an artificial hybrid of Fatsia japonica and Hedera hibernica.

== Cultivation ==
It is grown both as a garden plant outdoors and as a houseplant indoors, where its tolerance of shady conditions is valued. Inside, it grows well in bright indirect light. Outdoors, it can tolerate winter temperatures down to −15 °C (5 °F), but can also be grown successfully indoors with temperatures never falling below 20 °C (68 °F). Several cultivars have been selected, with dark green to variously white- or yellow-variegated leaves.

× Fatshedera lizei, together with the cultivars 'Annemieke' and 'Variegata' have gained the Royal Horticultural Society's Award of Garden Merit.
