= False castor oil plant =

False castor oil plant is the common name of two plants:

- Datura stramonium (jimsonweed, thorn-apple, devil's snare), from Mexico
- Fatsia japonica (fatsi, paperplant), from Japan

== See also ==
- castor oil plant
