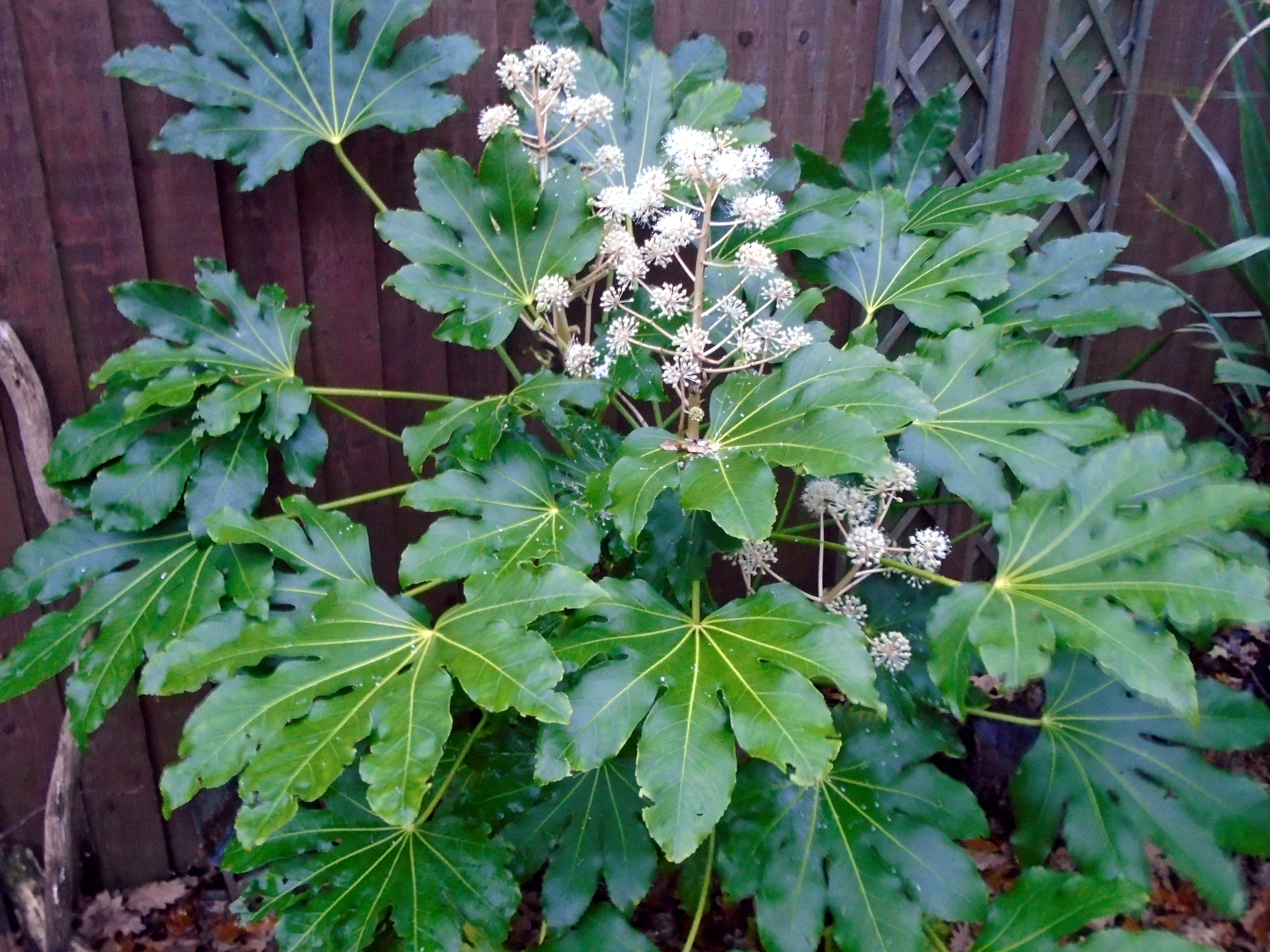

Scientific classification
- Kingdom: Plantae
- Clade: Tracheophytes
- Clade: Angiosperms
- Clade: Eudicots
- Clade: Asterids
- Order: Apiales
- Family: Araliaceae
- Genus: Fatsia
- Species: F. japonica

Binomial name
- Fatsia japonica (Thunb.) Decne. & Planch.

Synonyms
- Aralia japonica Thunb.; Aralia sieboldii hort. ex K.Koch

= Fatsia japonica =

Species of plant

Fatsia japonica, also fatsi, paperplant, false castor oil plant, or Japanese aralia, is a species of flowering plant in the family Araliaceae, native to southern Japan and southern Korea.

== Etymology ==
The name fatsi is an approximation of the Japanese word for 'eight' (hachi in modern romanization), referring to the eight leaf lobes. In Japan it is known as yatsude (八つ手), meaning "eight fingers". The name "Japanese aralia" is due to the genus being classified in the related genus Aralia in the past. It has been interbred with Hedera helix (common ivy) to produce the intergeneric hybrid × Fatshedera lizei.

== Description ==
It is an evergreen shrub growing to 1–5 m (3 ft 3 in – 16 ft 5 in) tall, with stout, sparsely branched stems. The leaves are spirally-arranged, large, 20–40 cm (7.9–15.7 in) in width and on a petiole up to 50 cm (20 in) long, leathery, palmately lobed, with 7–9 broad lobes, divided to half or two-thirds of the way to the base of the leaf; the lobes are edged with coarse, blunt teeth. The flowers are small, white, borne in dense terminal compound umbels in late autumn or early winter, followed by small black fruit in spring.

== Cultivation ==
It is commonly grown as an ornamental plant in warm temperate regions where winters do not fall below about −15 °C (5 °F). F. japonica thrives in semi-shade to full-shade and is winter hardy in USDA Zones 8–10. It can be grown as an indoor plant and has been shown to effectively remove gaseous formaldehyde from indoor air.

This plant and its cultivar F. japonica 'Variegata' have gained the Royal Horticultural Society's Award of Garden Merit.

An ornamental plant, F. japonica 'Spider's Web' (or 'Spider White') is a rare cultivar with variegated leaves. Slower growing than the original species, it reaches a lower maximum height of 2.5 m (8.2 ft) at maturity. The dark-green leaves are strongly white-flecked, particularly at the edges, though the white variegation may occasionally disperse across the whole leaf. The variegation may change with the seasons and as the plant ages. Terminal clumps of white flowers emerge in autumn, which are followed by black berries.

== Naturalisation ==
While grown as a landscaping plant, it has also become naturalised in some areas. In New Zealand, it has become established in waste areas and abandoned gardens, spreading by suckers and prolific self seeding.

== Health ==
The sap, which is sticky and resinous, can cause contact dermatitis in sensitive people.

== Gallery ==
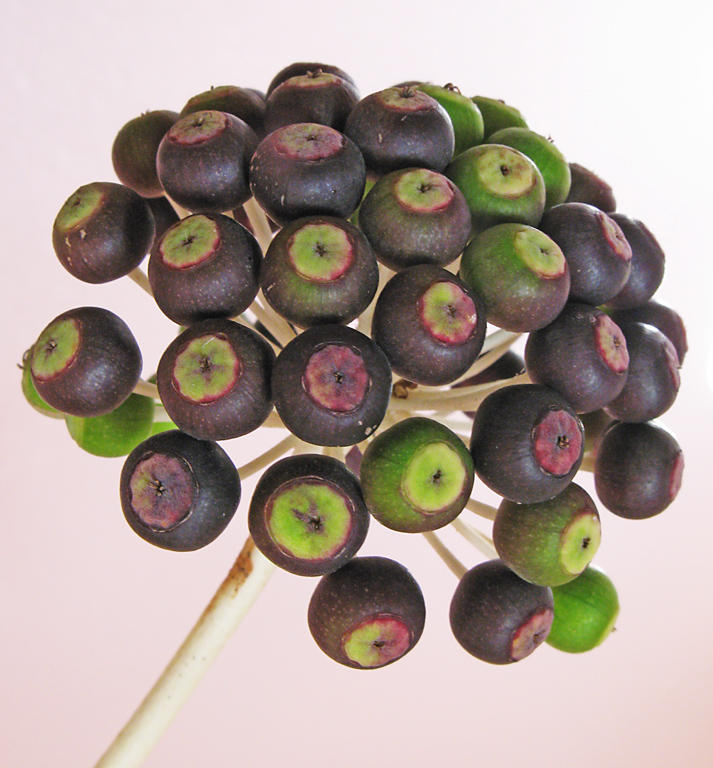
Fruiting body

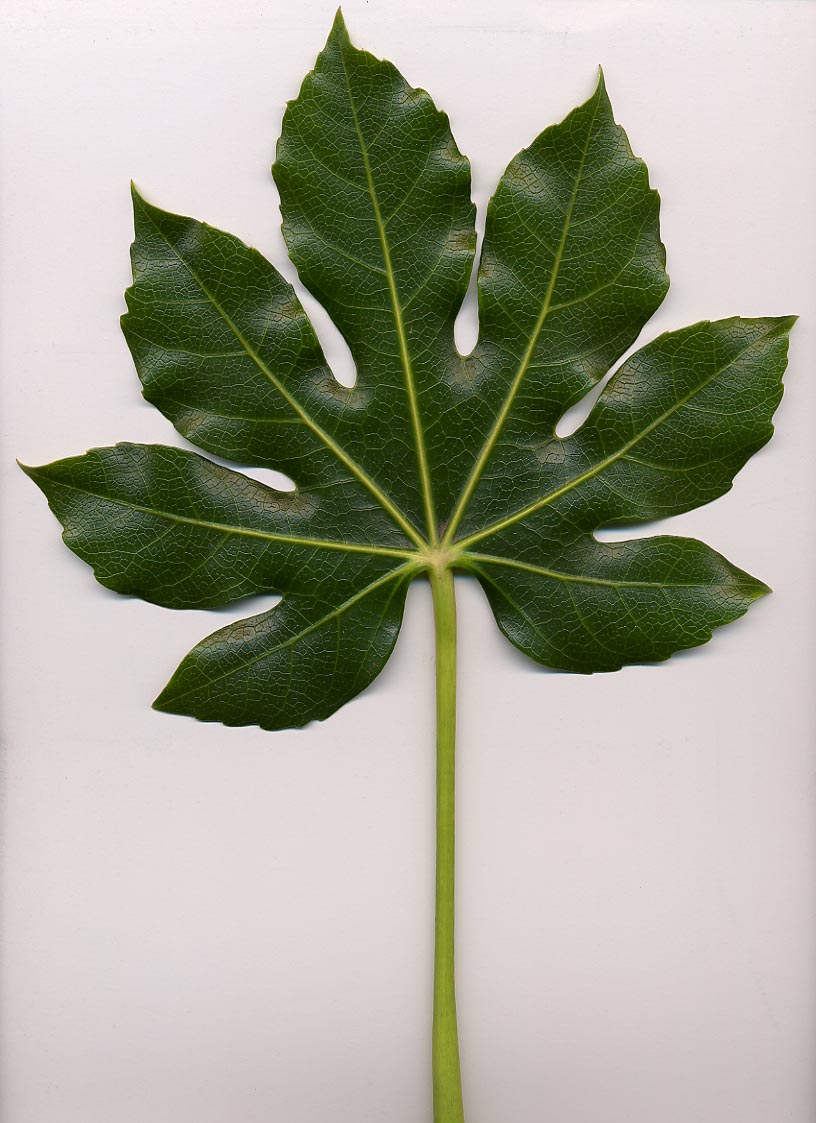
A small Fatsia japonica leaf

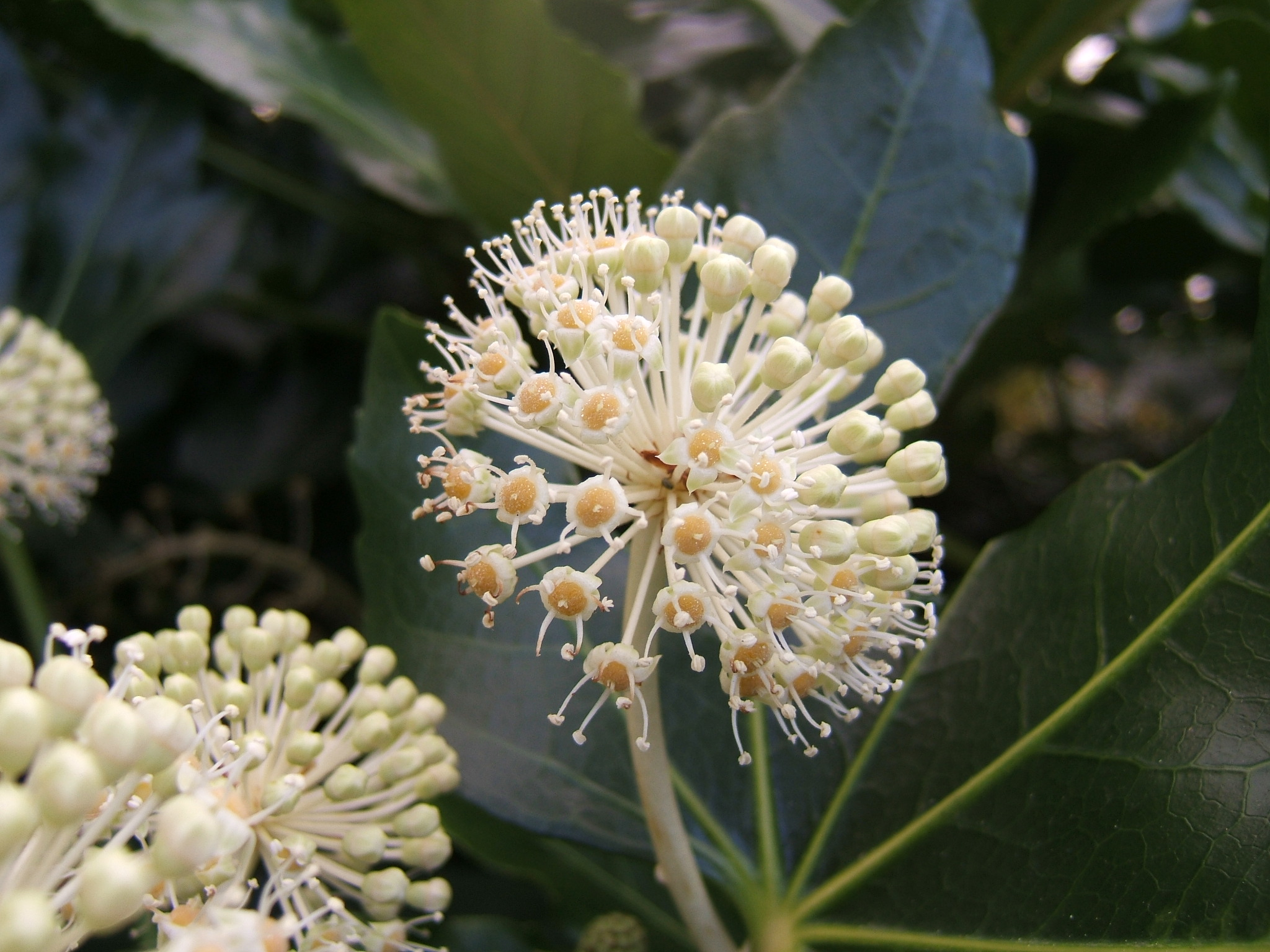
Close-up of flower umbel

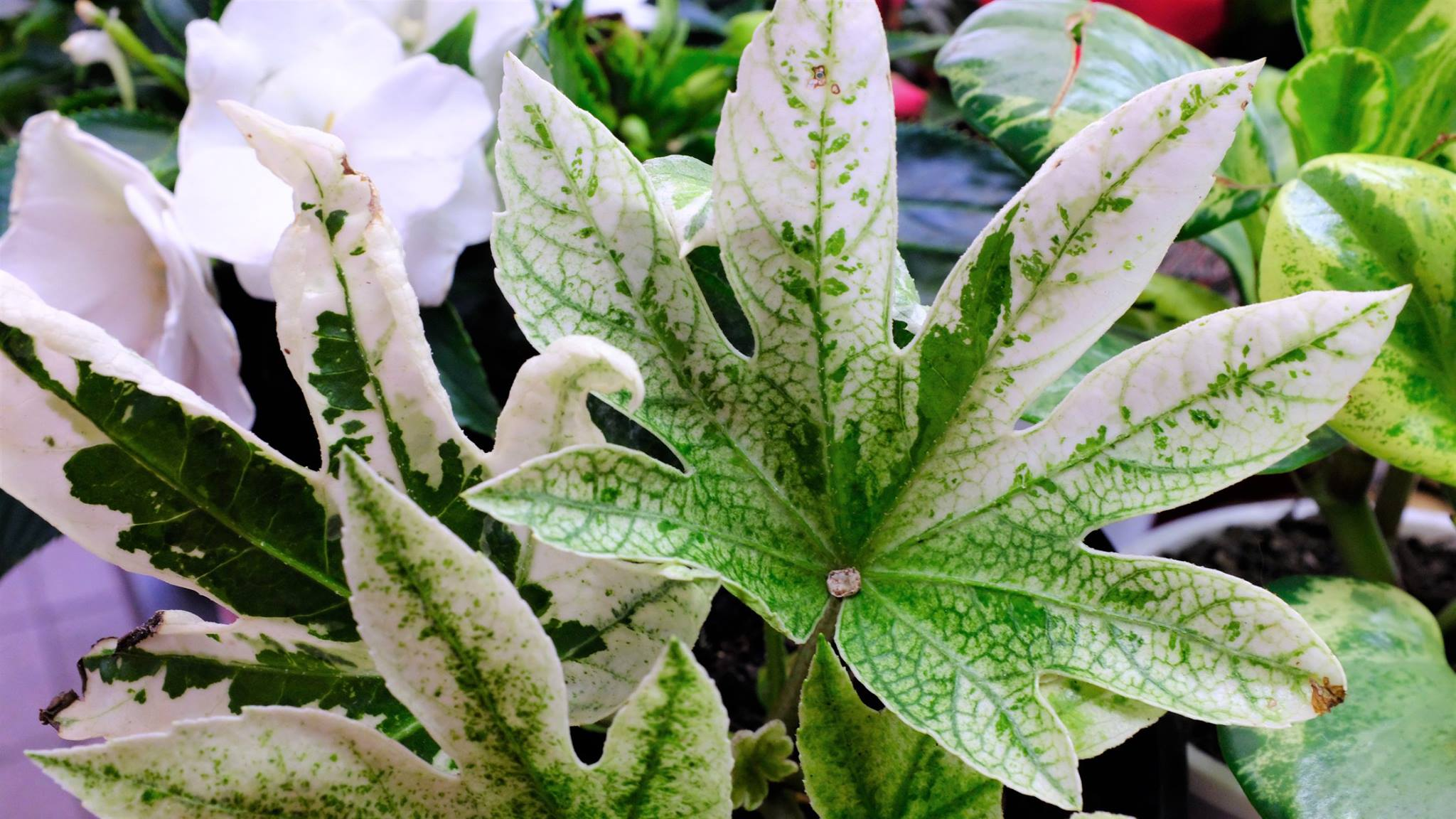
Variegated leaves of F. japonica 'Spider's Web'

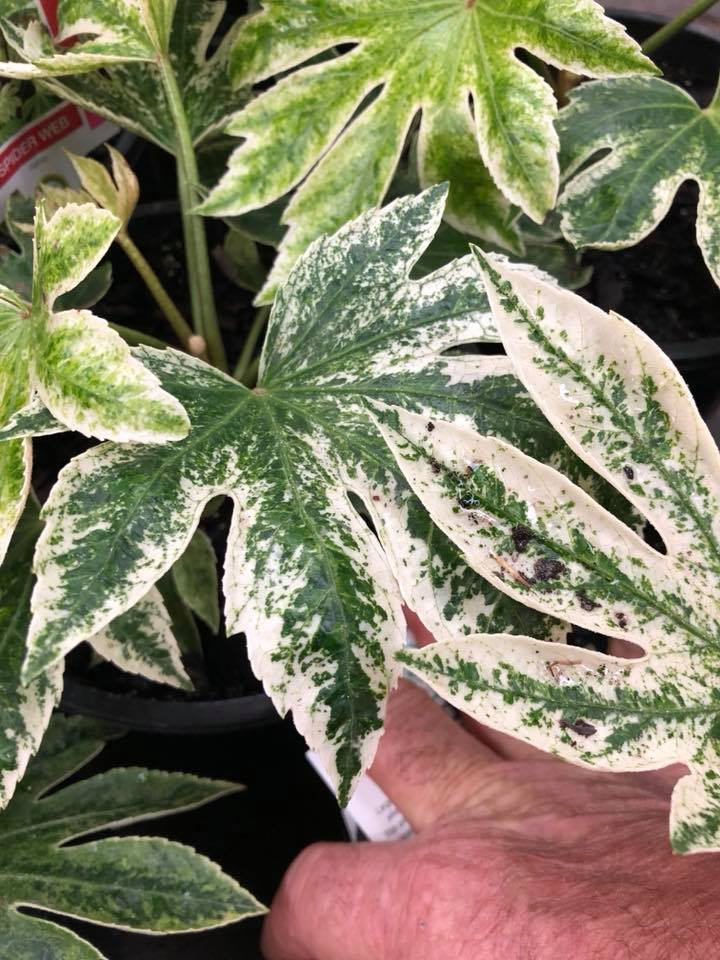
Fatsia 'Spider White'
