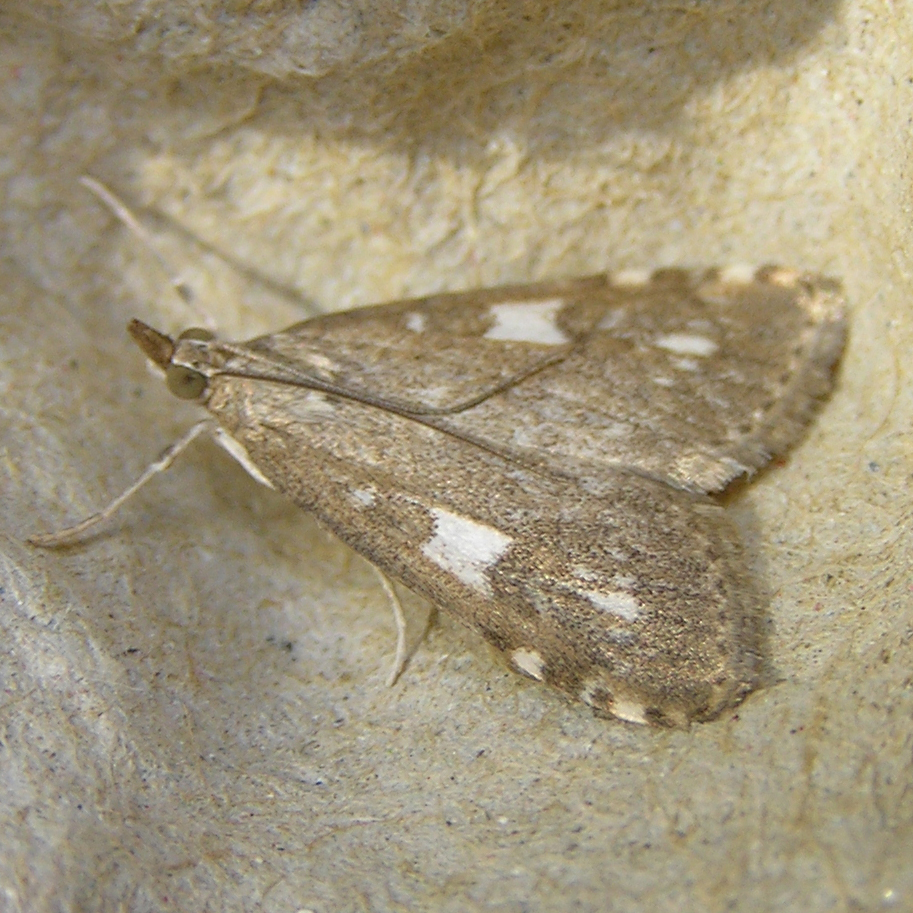

Scientific classification
- Domain: Eukaryota
- Kingdom: Animalia
- Phylum: Arthropoda
- Class: Insecta
- Order: Lepidoptera
- Family: Crambidae
- Genus: Udea
- Species: U. olivalis

Binomial name
- Udea olivalis (Denis & Schiffermüller, 1775)

Synonyms
- Pyralis olivalis Denis & Schiffermüller, 1775; Botys olivalis var. caucasica Staudinger, 1897; Botys olivalis var. transbaicalis Staudinger, 1897; Pyralis umbralis Hübner, 1796

= Udea olivalis =

Species of moth

Udea olivalis is a species of moth of the family Crambidae. It was first described by Michael Denis and Ignaz Schiffermüller in 1775 and is found in Europe.

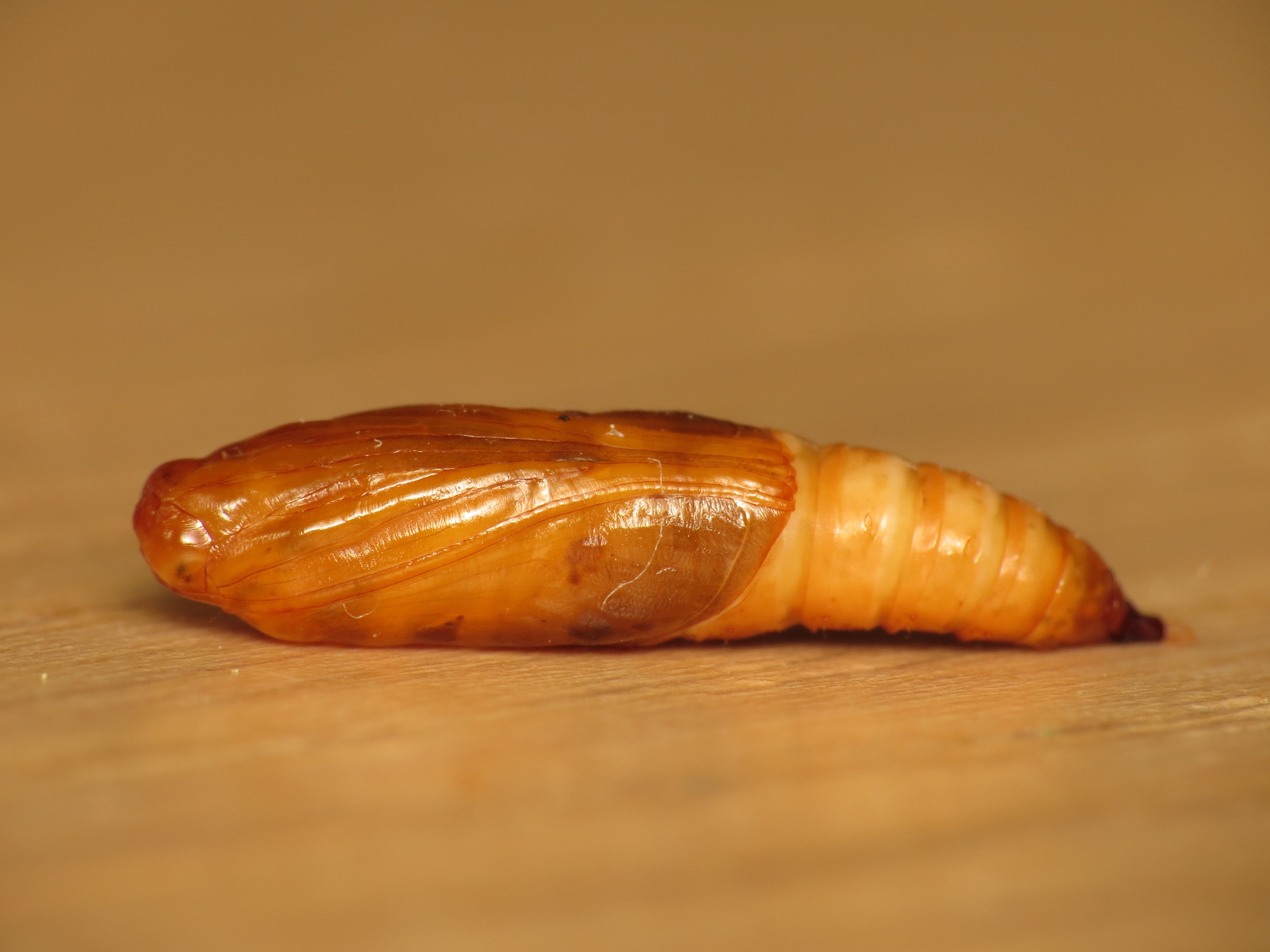
Pupa

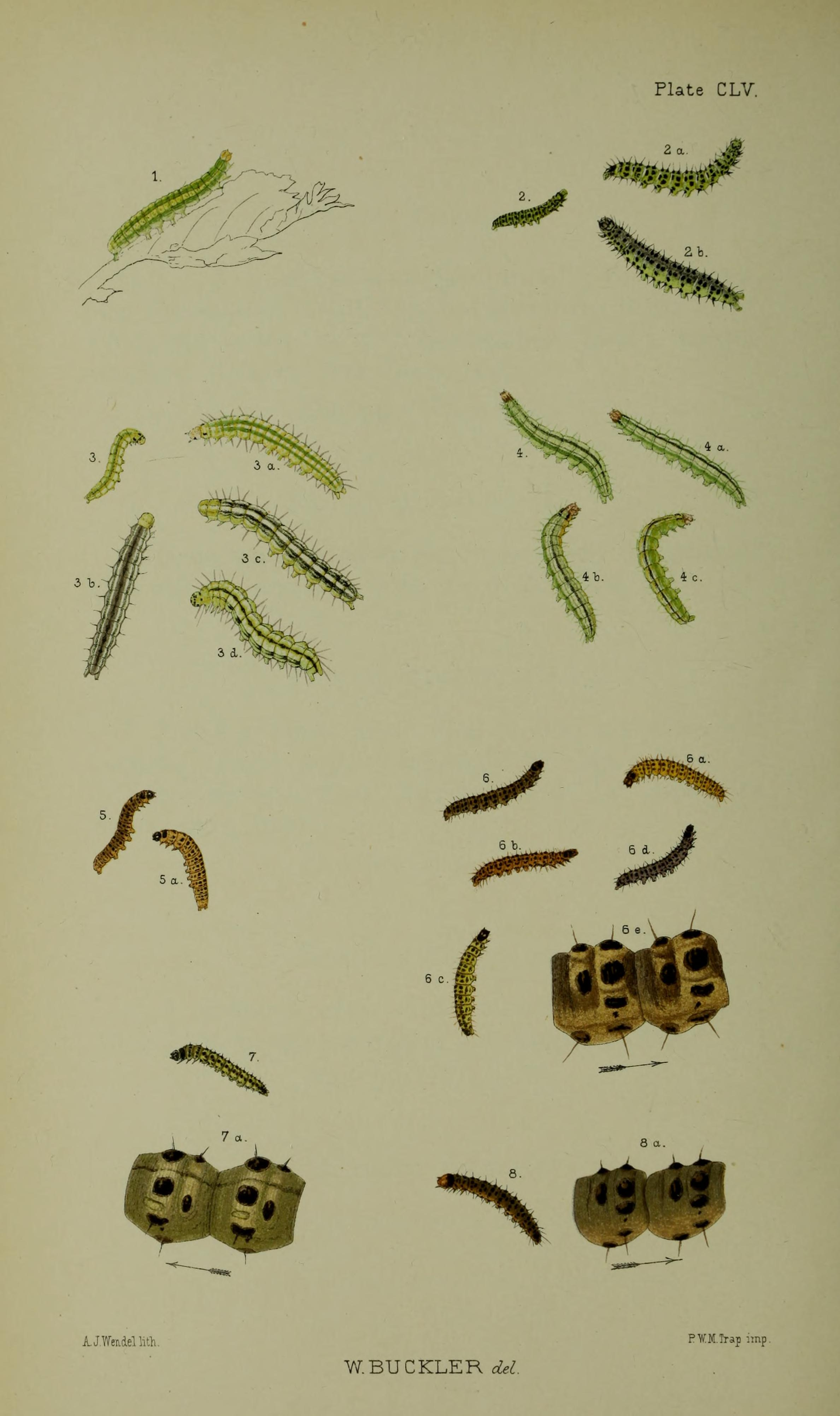
Figs.2, 2a, 2b larvae in various stages of growth

The wingspan is 24–28 mm. The forewings are greyish ochreous or brownish, densely sprinkled with dark fuscous lines hardly darker, indistinct, second serrate, often posteriorly whitish -edged, preceded in middle by a white spot, curved, with abrupt deep sinuation inwards below middle; large orbicular and reniform discal spot darker, separated by a subquadrate white spot; posterior half of costa whitish, dotted with dark fuscous. Hindwings white, dorsal half light grey; two dark grey discal dots; a fuscous terminal fascia. The larva is light green; dorsal line dark green; spots large, black; head and plate of 2 black-freckled

The moth flies from May to August depending on the location.

The larvae feed on various herbaceous plants, such as Hedera helix, Lychnis, Urtica, Symphytum officinale and Lamiaceae.
