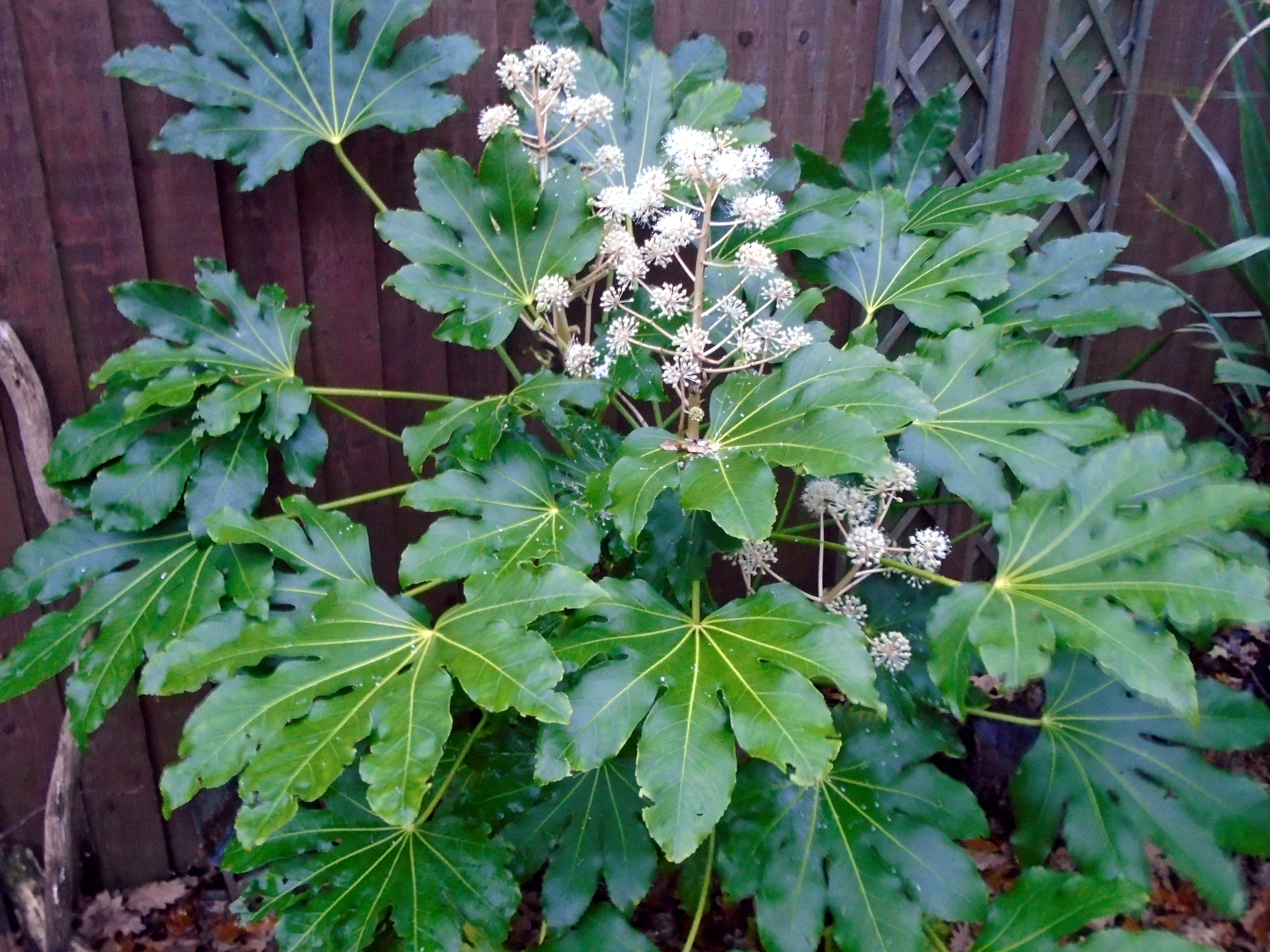
- Fatsia japonica in flower

Scientific classification
- Kingdom: Plantae
- Clade: Tracheophytes
- Clade: Angiosperms
- Clade: Eudicots
- Clade: Asterids
- Order: Apiales
- Family: Araliaceae
- Subfamily: Aralioideae
- Genus: Fatsia; Decne. & Planch.

Species
- Fatsia japonica Fatsia oligocarpella Fatsia polycarpa

Synonyms
- Boninofatsia Nakai; Diplofatsia Nakai

= Fatsia =

Fatsia Temporal range: Eocene–Present

Genus of flowering plants

Fatsia is a small genus of three extant species of evergreen shrubs in the family Araliaceae native to Korea, southern Japan and Taiwan. They typically have stout, sparsely branched stems bearing spirally-arranged, large leathery, palmately lobed leaves 20–50 cm in width, on a petiole up to 50 cm long, and small creamy-white flowers in dense terminal compound umbels in late autumn or early winter, followed by small black fruit. The genus was formerly classified within a broader interpretation of the related genus Aralia.

== Species ==
As of February 2026, Plants of the World Online accepted three species:

Image	Scientific name	Common name	Description	Distribution
	Fatsia japonica	fatsia, Japanese aralia, glossy-leaved paper plant, false castor oil plant, fig-leaf palm	shrub growing to 3–6 m tall. The leaves have 7–9 broad lobes, divided to half or two-thirds of the way to the base of the leaf; the lobes are edged with coarse, blunt teeth.	southern Japan and southern Korea.
	Fatsia oligocarpella		differs in the lobes on the leaves being less coarsely toothed, but is otherwise very similar.	From the Bonin Islands. It is naturalised in Hawaii.
	Fatsia polycarpa		The leaves have 9–13 deep, narrow lobes, divided nearly to the base of the leaf. Some authors treat it in a separate genus, as Diplofatsia polycarpa.	Native to Taiwan's mountainous areas.

A sterile hybrid between Fatsia japonica and Hedera hibernica, named × Fatshedera lizei, has been produced in cultivation in western Europe in both plain green and variegated forms.

Some species formerly included in Fatsia are now classified in other genera. Fatsia papyrifera is now Tetrapanax papyrifer and Fatsia horrida is now Oplopanax horridus.

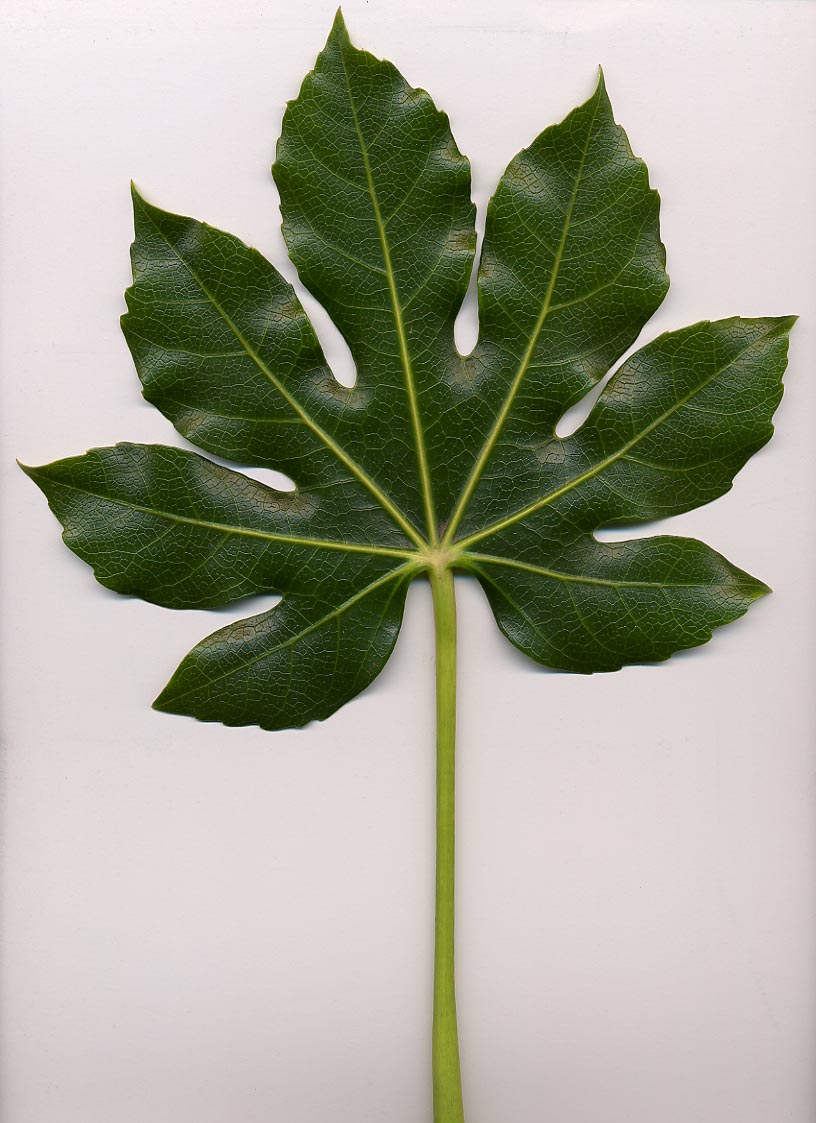
A small Fatsia japonica leaf

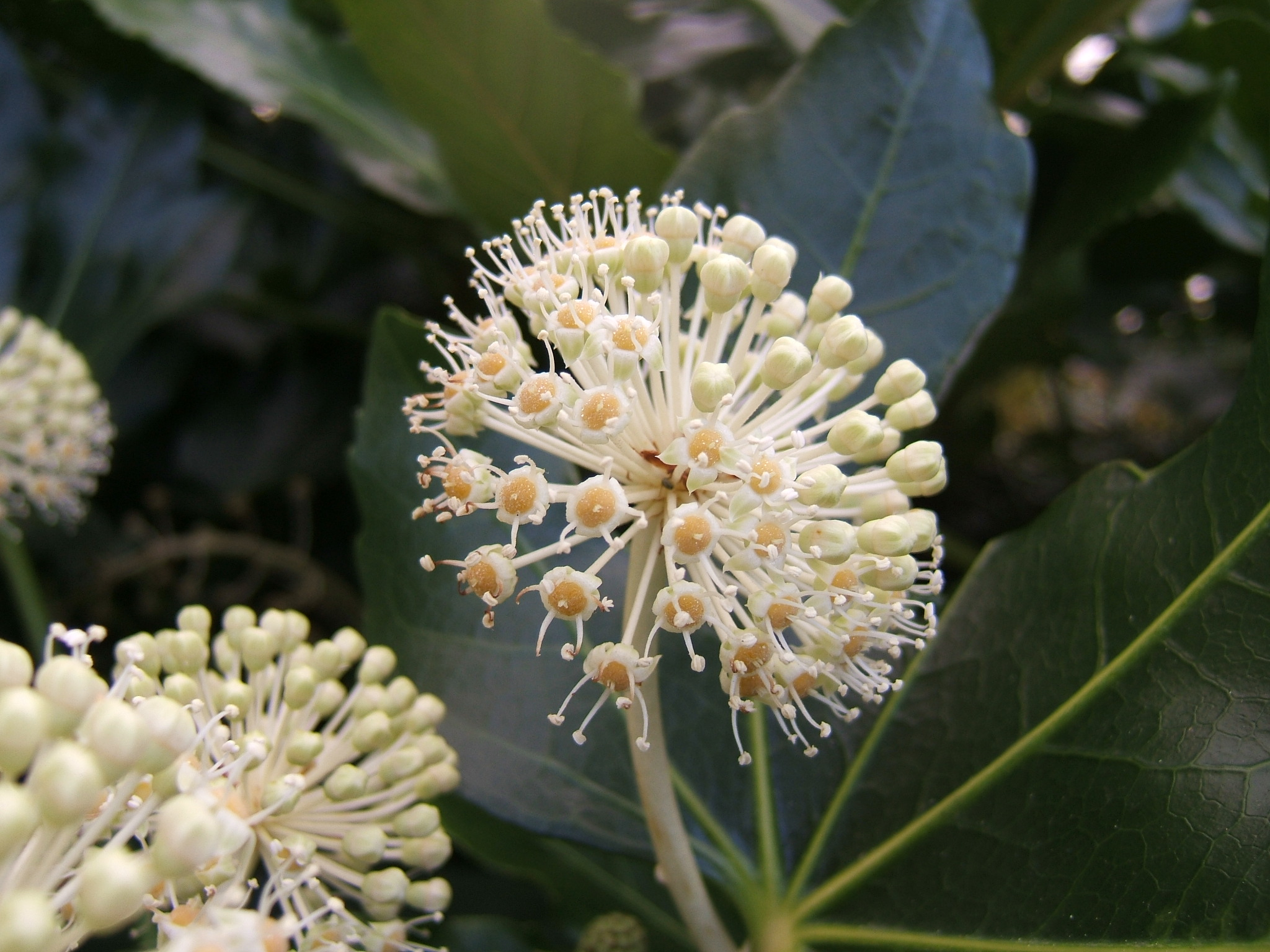
Close-up of flower umbel

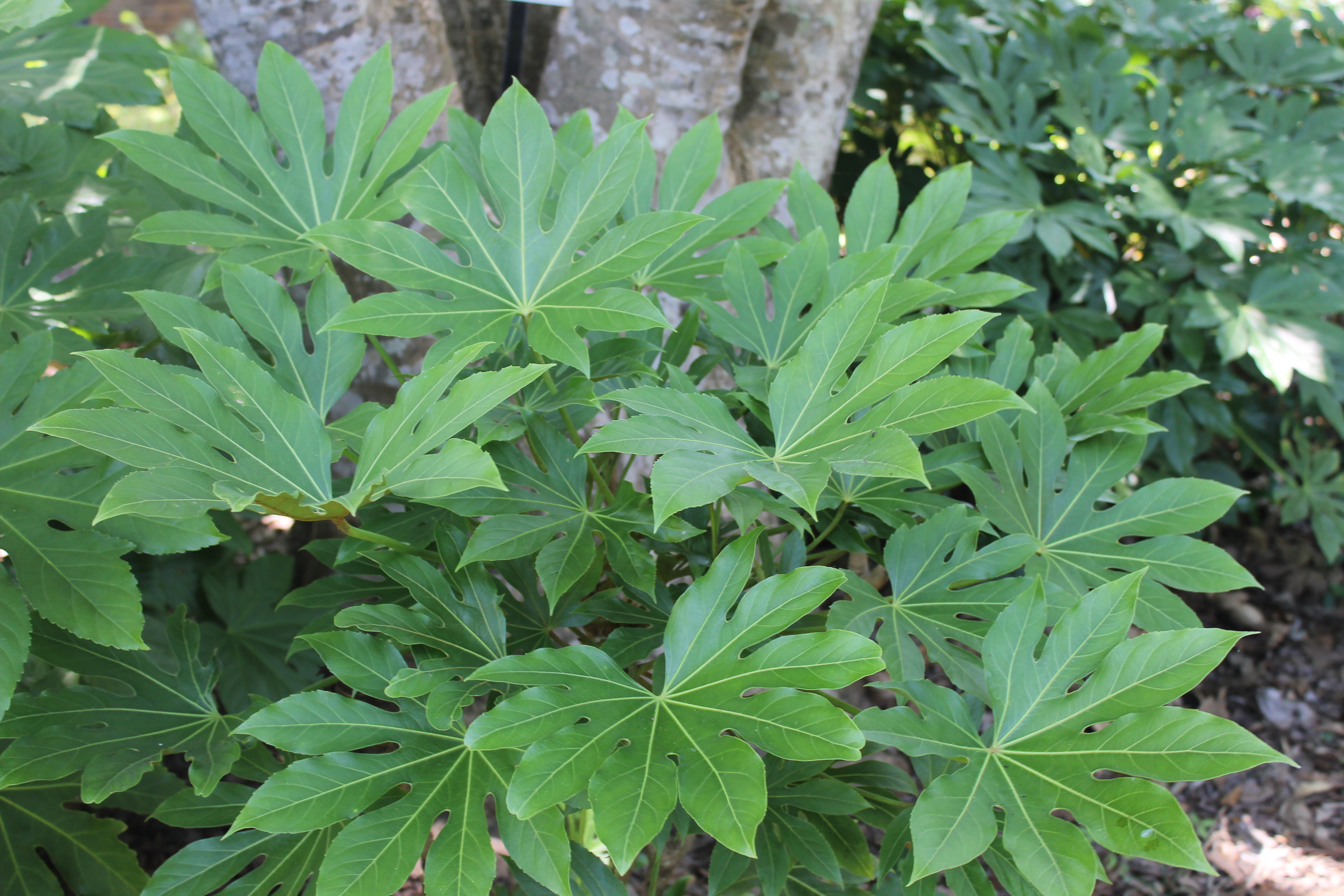
Fatsia, Japanese aralia at Rosalie Mansion in Natchez, Mississippi
