= Α-Hederin =

α-Hederin

Names
- IUPAC name 23-Hydroxy-3β-[α-L-rhamnopyranosyl-(2→1)-α-L-arabinopyranosyloxy]olean-12-en-28-oic acid
- Systematic IUPAC name (4aS,6aS,4bR,8aR,9R,10S,12aR,12bR,14bS)-10-{[(2S,3R,4S,5S)-4,5-Dihydroxy-3-{[(2S,3R,4R,5R,6S)-3,4,5-trihydroxy-6-methyloxan-2-yl]oxy}oxan-2-yl]oxy}-9-(hydroxymethyl)-2,2,6a,6b,9,12a-hexamethyl-1,3,4,5,6,6a,6b,7,8,8a,9,10,11,12,12a,12b,13,14b-octadecahydro-2H-picene-4a-carboxylic acid

Identifiers
| CAS Number | 27013-91-8 |
| 3D model (JSmol) | Interactive image |
| ChemSpider | 66036 |
| ECHA InfoCard | 100.043.773 |
| EC Number | 248-166-5 |
| PubChem CID | 73296 |
| UNII | 4H15F0GLV2 |
| CompTox Dashboard (EPA) | DTXSID80909168 DTXSID20949785, DTXSID80909168 |
- InChI: InChI=1S/C41H66O12/c1-21-28(44)30(46)31(47)33(51-21)53-32-29(45)24(43)19-50-34(32)52-27-11-12-37(4)25(38(27,5)20-42)10-13-40(7)26(37)9-8-22-23-18-36(2,3)14-16-41(23,35(48)49)17-15-39(22,40)6/h8,21,23-34,42-47H,9-20H2,1-7H3,(H,48,49)/t21-,23-,24-,25+,26+,27-,28-,29-,30+,31+,32+,33-,34-,37-,38-,39+,40+,41-/m0/s1 Key: KEOITPILCOILGM-LLJOFIFVSA-N
- SMILES: C[C@H]1[C@@H]([C@H]([C@H]([C@@H](O1)O[C@@H]2[C@H]([C@H](CO[C@H]2O[C@H]3CC[C@]4([C@H]([C@]3(C)CO)CC[C@@]5([C@@H]4CC=C6[C@]5(CC[C@@]7([C@H]6CC(CC7)(C)C)C(=O)O)C)C)C)O)O)O)O)O

Properties
| Chemical formula | C_{41}H_{66}O_{12} |
| Molar mass | 750.967 g·mol^{−1} |
- Except where otherwise noted, data are given for materials in their standard state (at 25 °C [77 °F], 100 kPa). Infobox references

α-Hederin (alpha-hederin) is a water-soluble pentacyclic triterpenoid saponin found in the seeds of Nigella sativa and leaves of Hedera helix.

== Anticancer studies ==
α-Hederin and also its derivative, kalopanaxsaponin-I, have been studied for their anticancer activities. α-Hederin has been shown to enhance the cytotoxicity of an established chemotherapeutic agent, 5-fluorouracil, in an animal model of colon carcinoma.

== See also ==
- Hederagenin
- Thymoquinone
