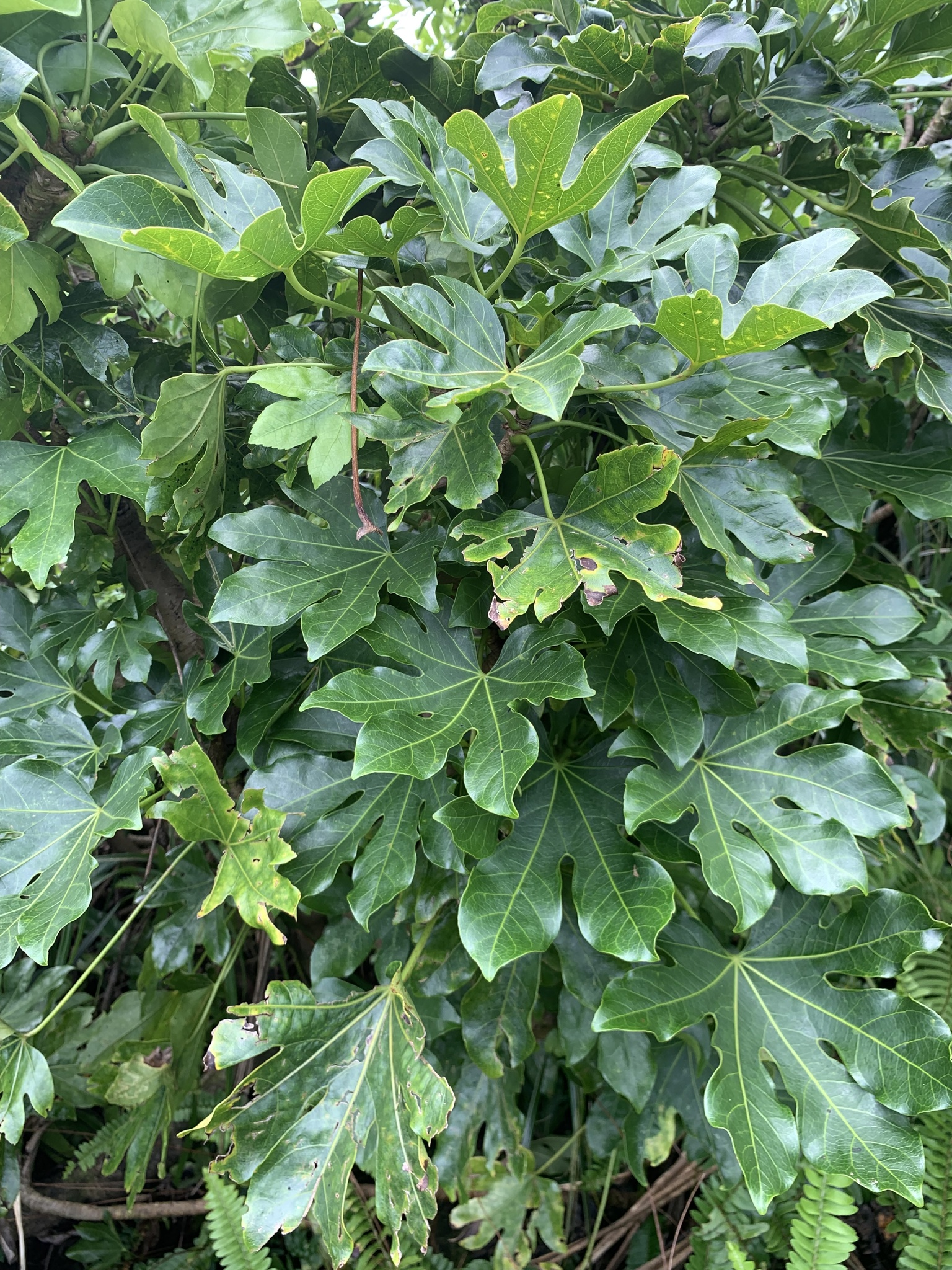

Scientific classification
- Kingdom: Plantae
- Clade: Tracheophytes
- Clade: Angiosperms
- Clade: Eudicots
- Clade: Asterids
- Order: Apiales
- Family: Araliaceae
- Genus: Fatsia
- Species: F. oligocarpella

Binomial name
- Fatsia oligocarpella Koidz.

= Fatsia oligocarpella =

Species of flowering plant

Fatsia oligocarpella is a species of flowering plant in the family Araliaceae, native to the Bonin Islands and the Volcano Islands, both belonging to Japan.
