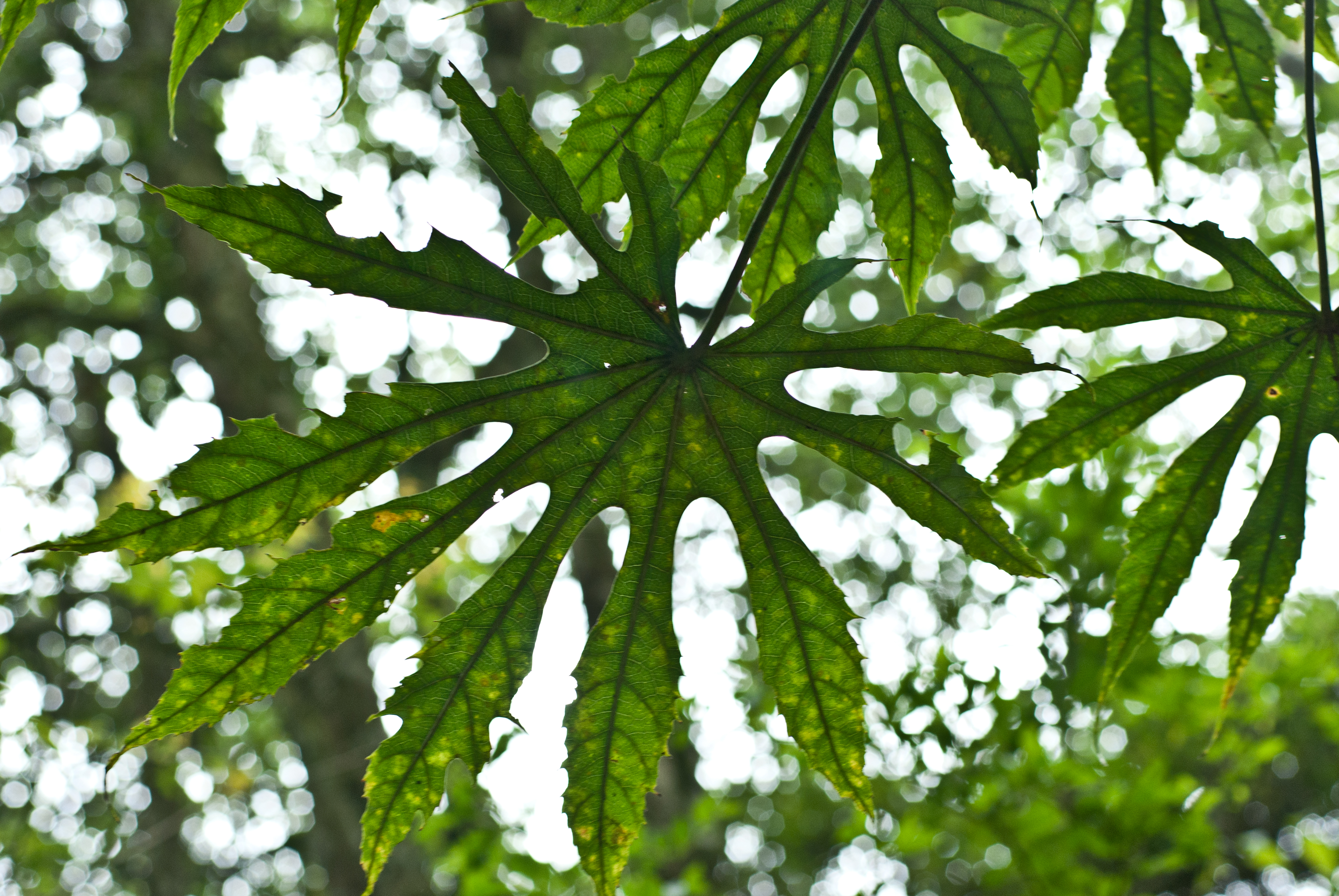

Conservation status
- Near Threatened (IUCN 2.3)

Scientific classification
- Kingdom: Plantae
- Clade: Tracheophytes
- Clade: Angiosperms
- Clade: Eudicots
- Clade: Asterids
- Order: Apiales
- Family: Araliaceae
- Genus: Fatsia
- Species: F. polycarpa

Binomial name
- Fatsia polycarpa Hayata

= Fatsia polycarpa =

Species of flowering plant

Fatsia polycarpa, the many-fruited aralia, is a species of flowering plant in the family Araliaceae, endemic to Taiwan, where it is threatened by habitat loss. Growing to 4 m (13 ft) tall by 2.5 m (8.2 ft) broad, it is a substantial evergreen shrub with large palmate leaves to 30 cm (12 in). Spherical clusters of cream or white flowers are produced in winter, followed by black fruits in spring.

Fatsia polycarpa is cultivated as an ornamental plant. In temperate climates it can be grown outside in a sheltered spot without frost. Otherwise it should be grown under glass in bright light, but not direct sunlight. The cultivar 'Green Fingers' is slightly more tender and has slightly narrower leaves.
