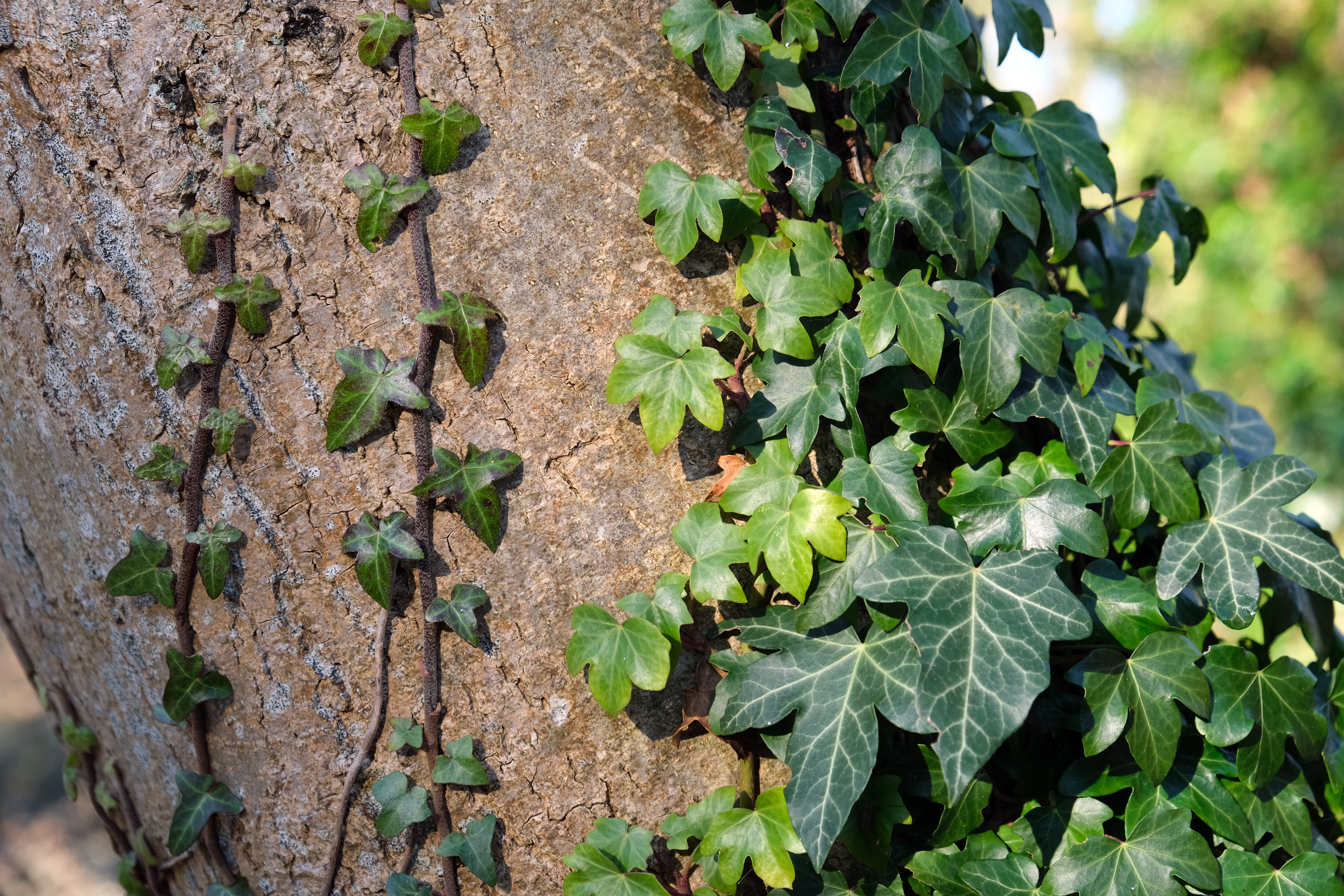
- Creeping ivy in Dover, UK

Conservation status
- Least Concern (IUCN 3.1)

Scientific classification
- Kingdom: Plantae
- Clade: Tracheophytes
- Clade: Angiosperms
- Clade: Eudicots
- Clade: Asterids
- Order: Apiales
- Family: Araliaceae
- Genus: Hedera
- Species: H. helix

Binomial name
- Hedera helix L.
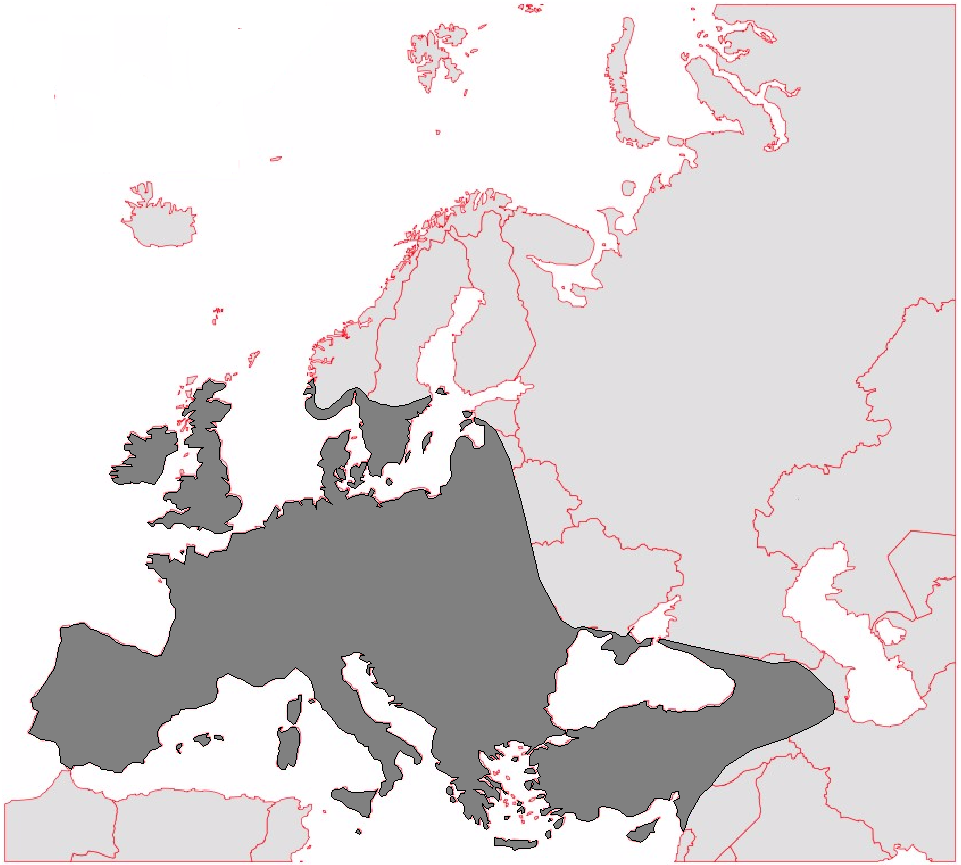
- Range of Hedera helix

= Hedera helix =

Species of flowering plant

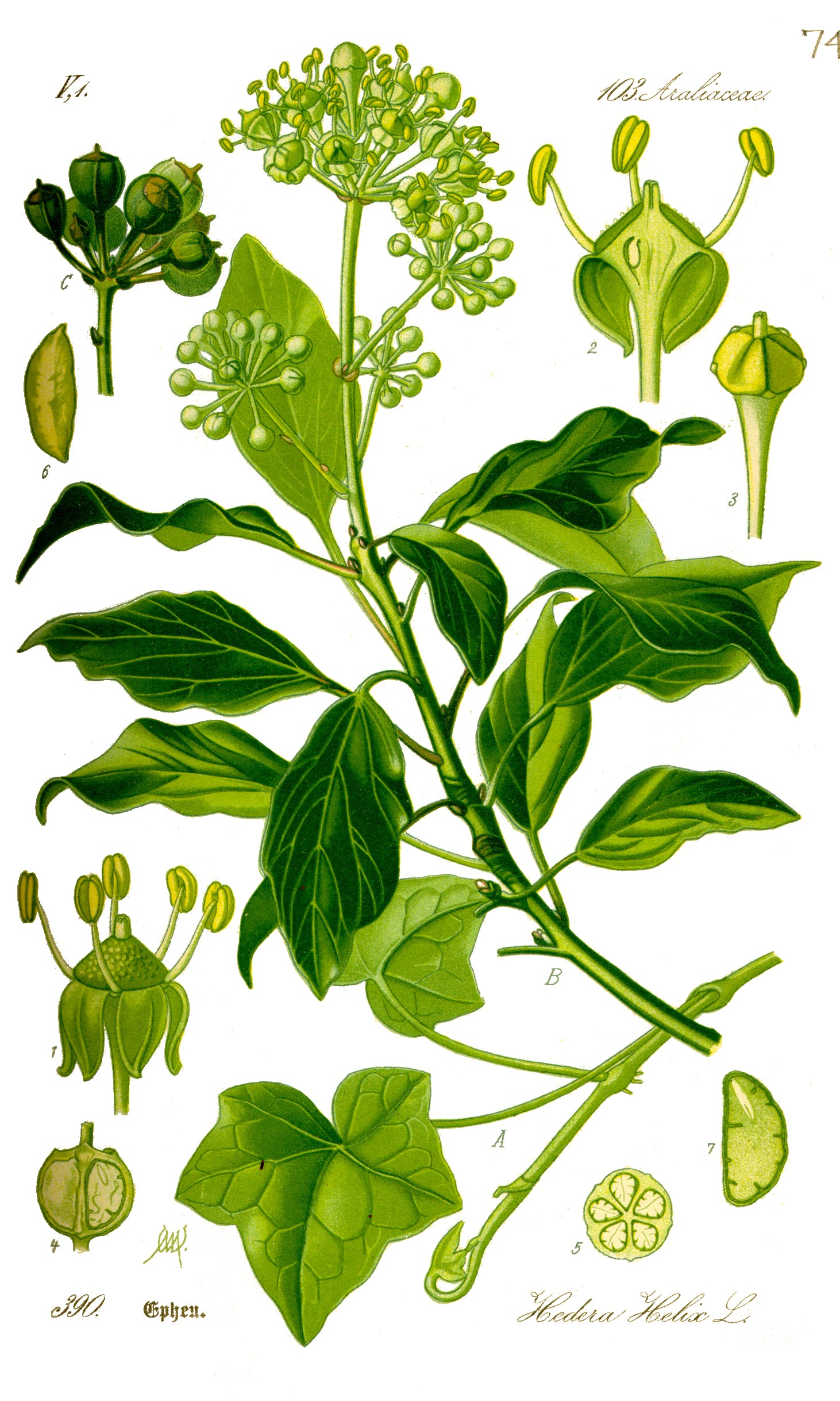
Botanical illustration of H. Helix.

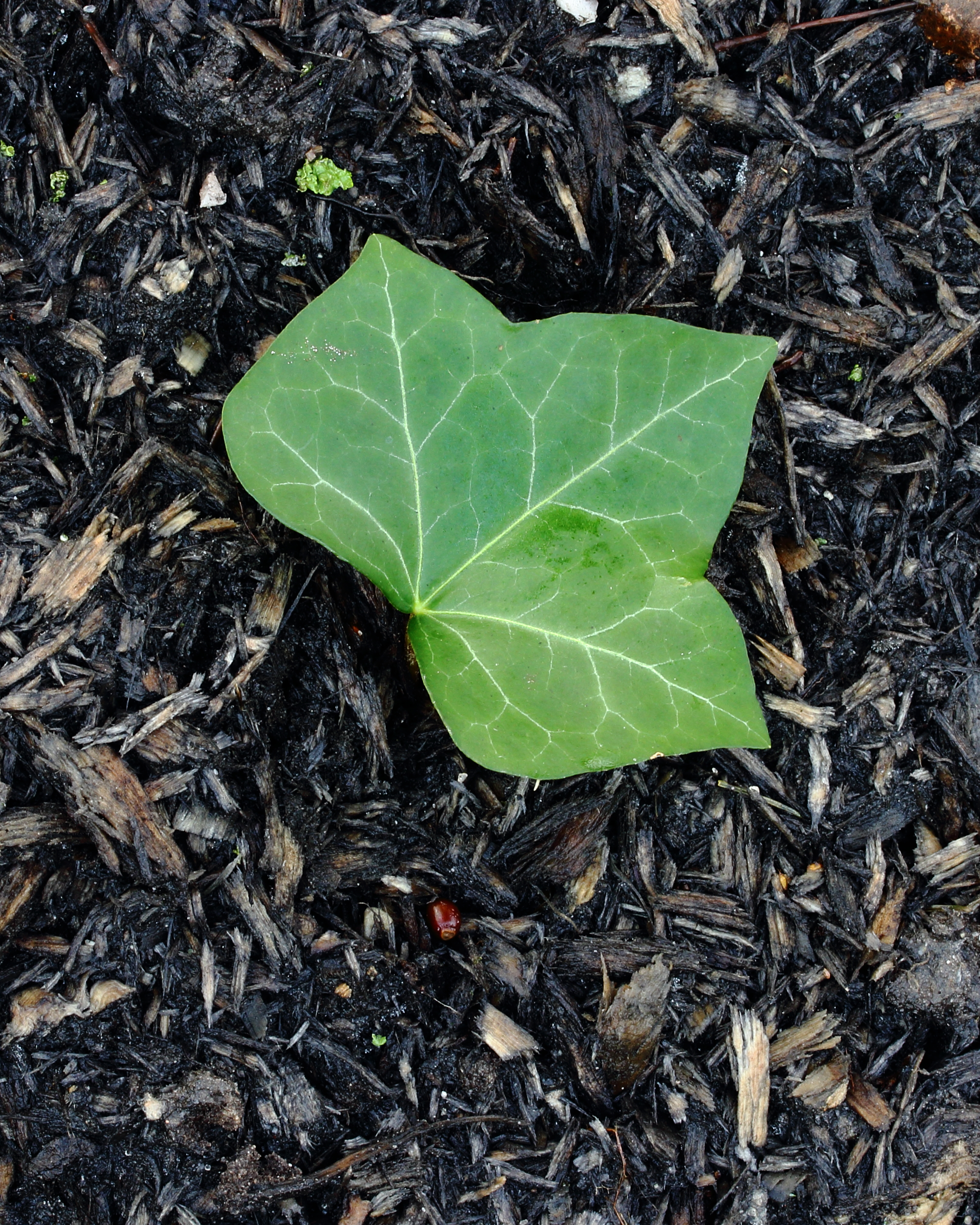
Leaf

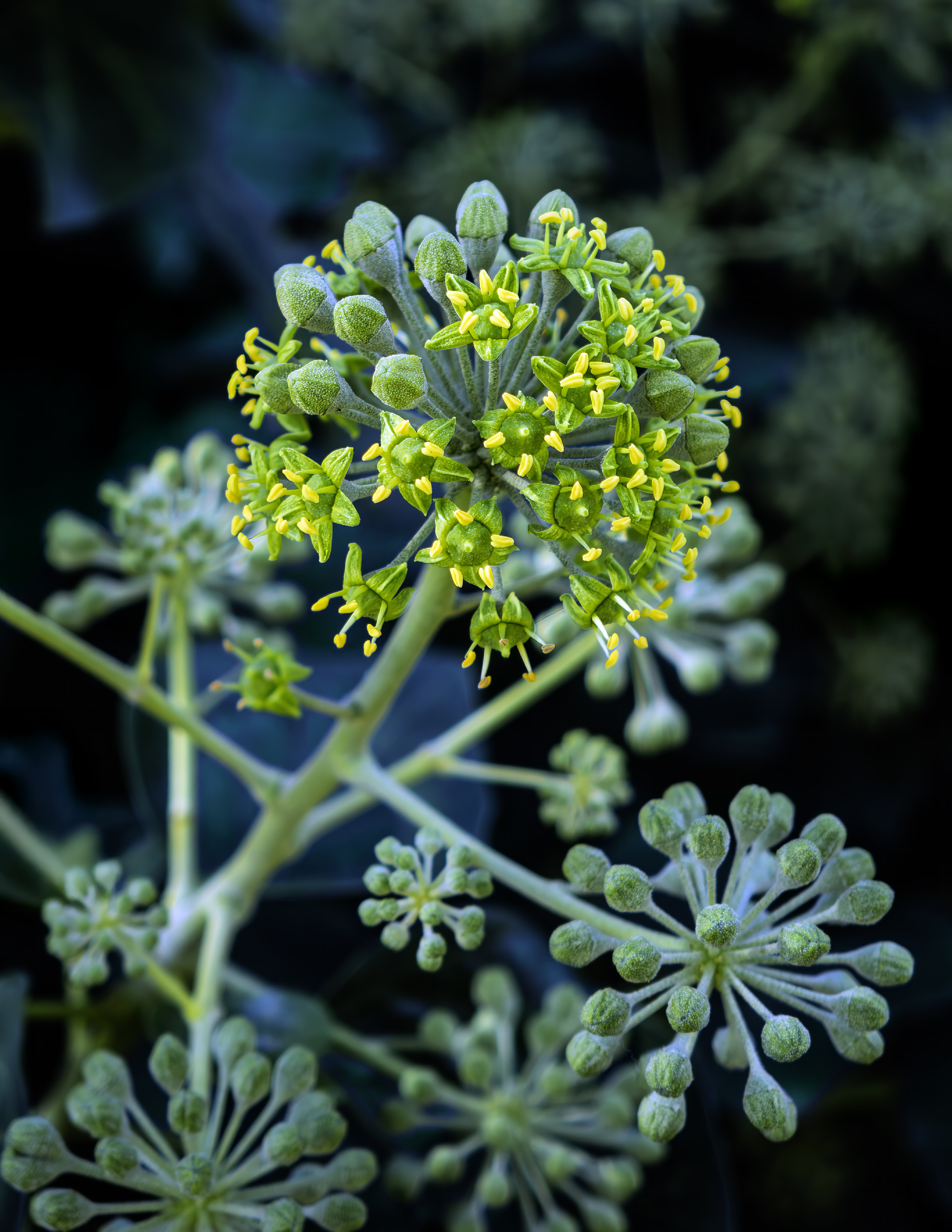
Immature inflorescence

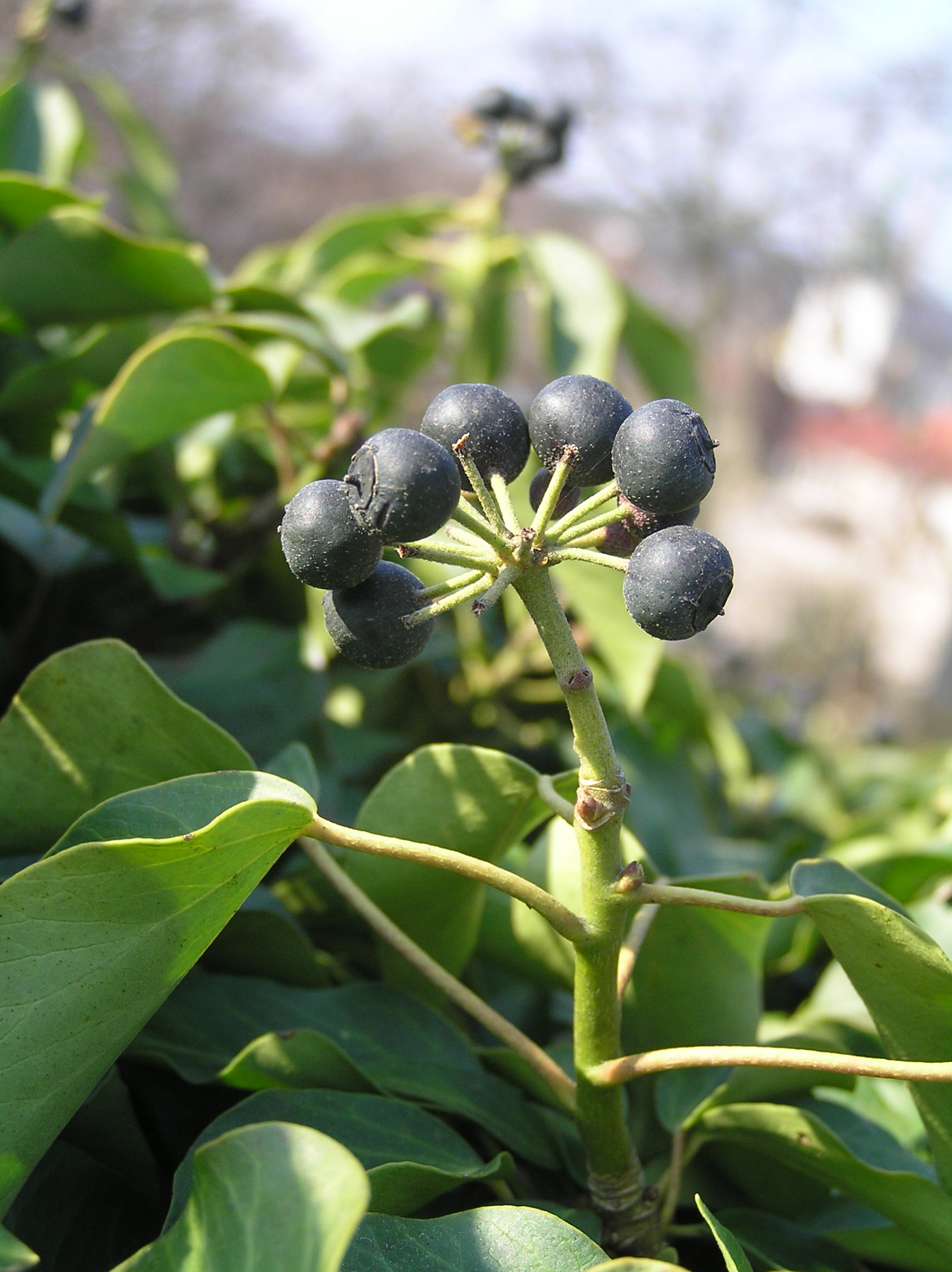
Berries

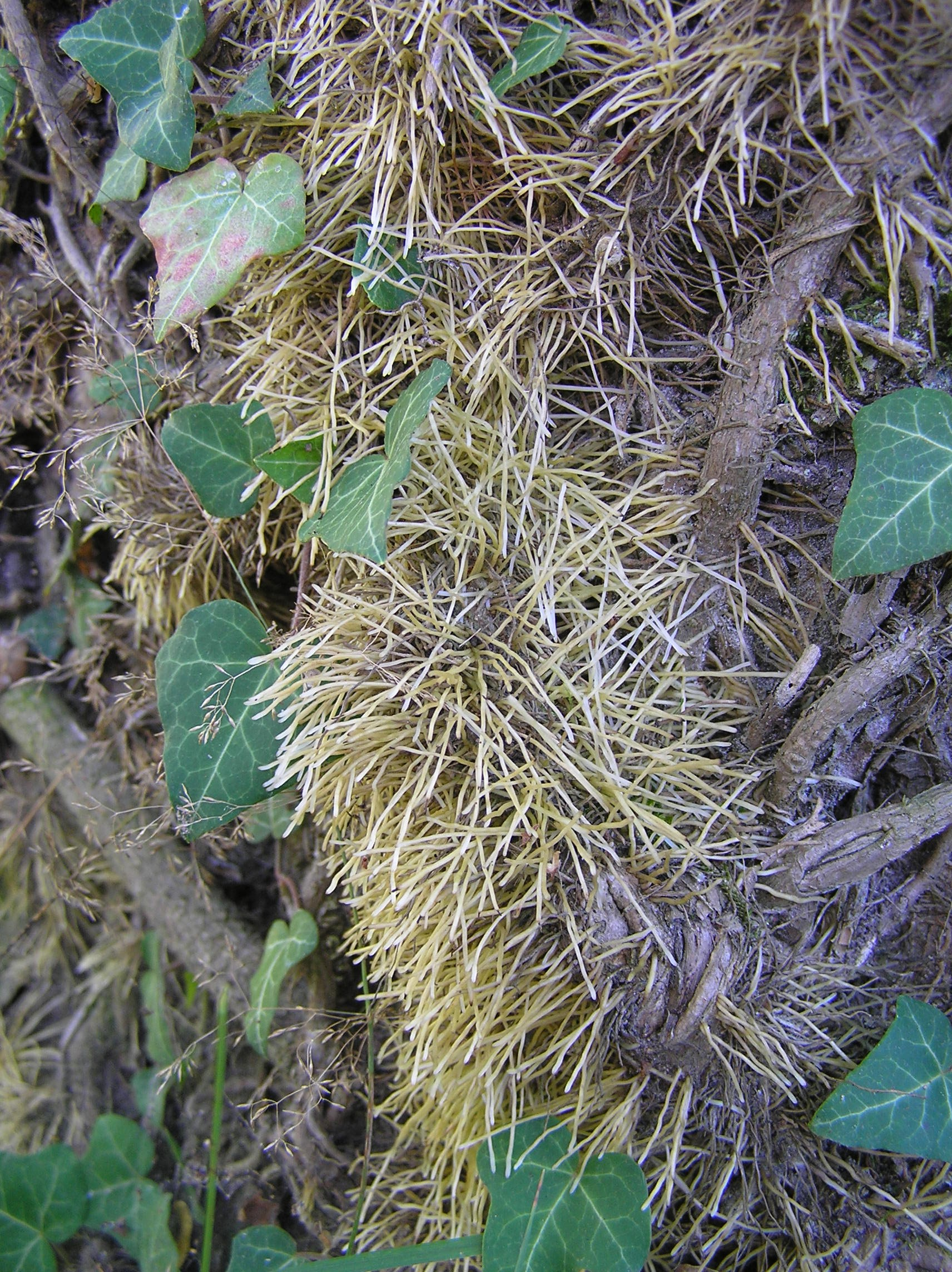
Stems with rootlets used to cling to walls and tree trunks

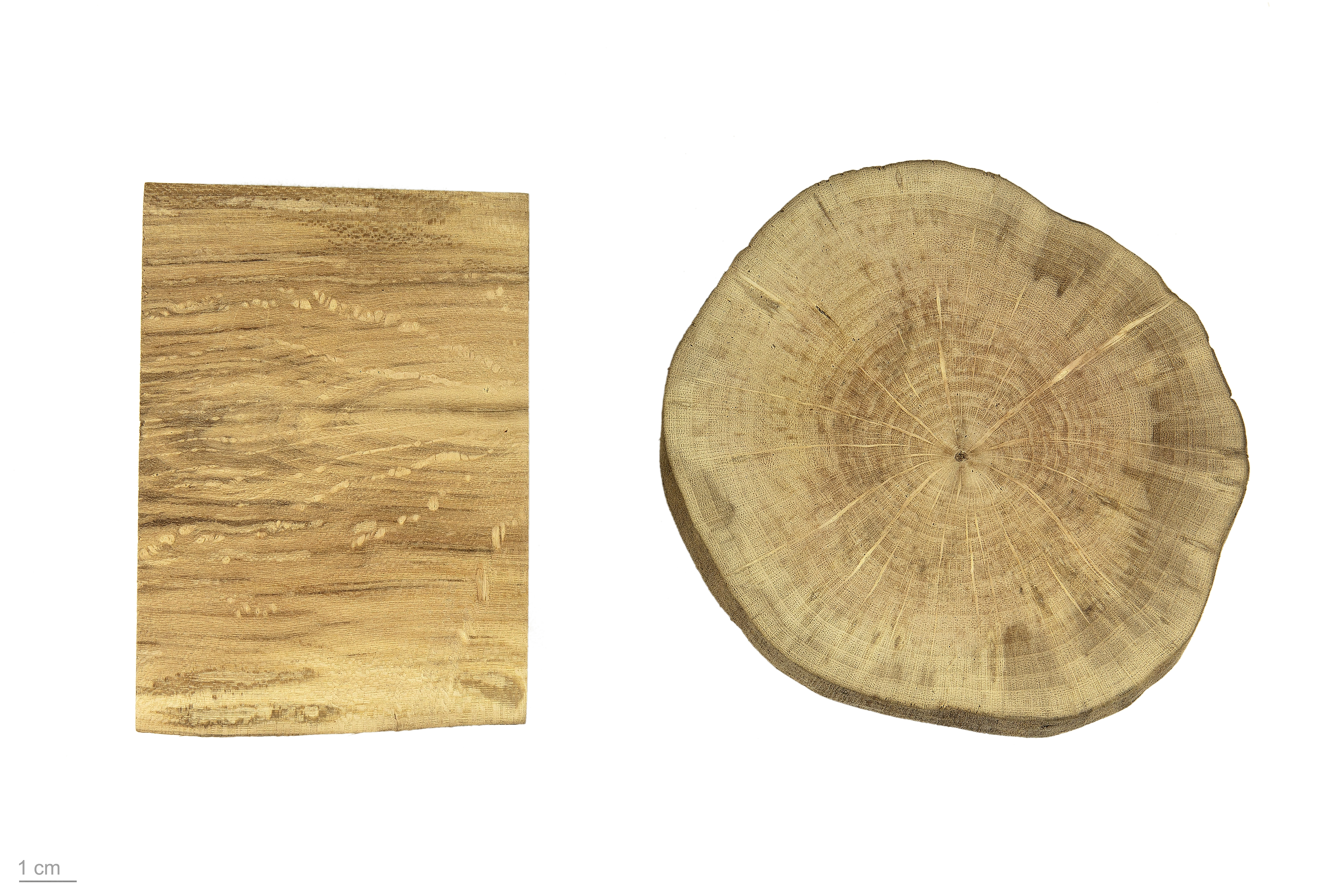
Hedera helix (MHNT)

Hedera helix, simply ivy, or common ivy, English ivy, European ivy, or King's choice ivy, is a species of flowering plant in the family Araliaceae. It is native to most of Europe and parts of western Asia. Ivy is a clinging evergreen vine that grows on tree trunks, walls, and fences in gardens, waste spaces, and wild habitats. Ivy is common as an ornamental plant, but escaped plants become naturalised outside its native range. Ivy has considerable cultural significance and symbolism.

Synonyms include Hedera acuta, Hedera arborea ('tree ivy'), Hedera baccifera, and Hedera grandifolia. Other common names are bindwood and lovestone.

== Description ==
Hedera helix is an evergreen climbing plant, growing to 20–30 m (66–98 ft) high where suitable surfaces (trees, cliffs, walls) are available, and also growing as groundcover where no vertical surfaces occur. It climbs by means of aerial rootlets with matted pads which cling strongly to the substrate. The ability to climb on surfaces varies with the plant's variety and other factors: H. helix prefers non-reflective, darker and rough surfaces with near-neutral pH. It generally thrives in a wide range of soil pH with 6.5 being ideal, prefers moist, shady locations and avoids exposure to direct sunlight, the latter promoting drying out in winter.

The leaves are alternate, 50–100 mm (2–4 in) long, with a 15–20 mm (0.6–0.8 in) petiole; they are of two types, with palmately five-lobed juvenile leaves on creeping and climbing stems, and unlobed cordate adult leaves on fertile flowering stems exposed to full sun, usually high in the crowns of trees or the top of rock faces.

The flowers are produced from late summer until late autumn, individually small, in 3-to-5 cm-diameter (1.2-to-2.0 in) umbels, greenish-yellow, and very rich in nectar, an important late autumn food source for bees and other insects.

The fruit are purple-black to orange-yellow berries 6–8 mm (0.2–0.3 in) in diameter, ripening in late winter, and are an important food source for many birds. One to five seeds are in each berry, which are dispersed after being eaten by birds.

=== Subspecies ===
The three subspecies are:

- H. h. helix − central, northern and western Europe, plants without rhizomes, purple-black ripe fruit,
- H. h. poetarum Nyman (syn. Hedera chrysocarpa Walsh) (Italian ivy, poet's ivy) − southeast Europe and southwest Asia (Italy, Balkans, Turkey), plants without rhizomes, orange-yellow ripe fruit,
- H. h. rhizomatifera McAllister − southeast Spain, plants rhizomatous, purple-black ripe fruit.

The closely related species Hedera canariensis and Hedera hibernica are also often treated as subspecies of H. helix, though they differ in chromosome number and so do not hybridise readily. H. helix can be best distinguished by the shape and colour of its leaf trichomes, usually smaller and slightly more deeply lobed leaves and somewhat less vigorous growth, though identification is often not easy.

== Etymology ==
The genus name Hedera is the Classical Latin word for 'ivy', which is cognate with Greek χανδάνω (khandánō) 'to get, grasp', both deriving ultimately from Proto-Indo-European *gʰed(h)- 'to seize, grasp, take'. The specific epithet helix was borrowed into Latin from Ancient Greek ἕλιξ (helix), 'helix', 'spiral'.. The binomial in its entirety thus has the meaning "the clinging plant that coils in spirals (helices)".

== Distribution and habitat ==
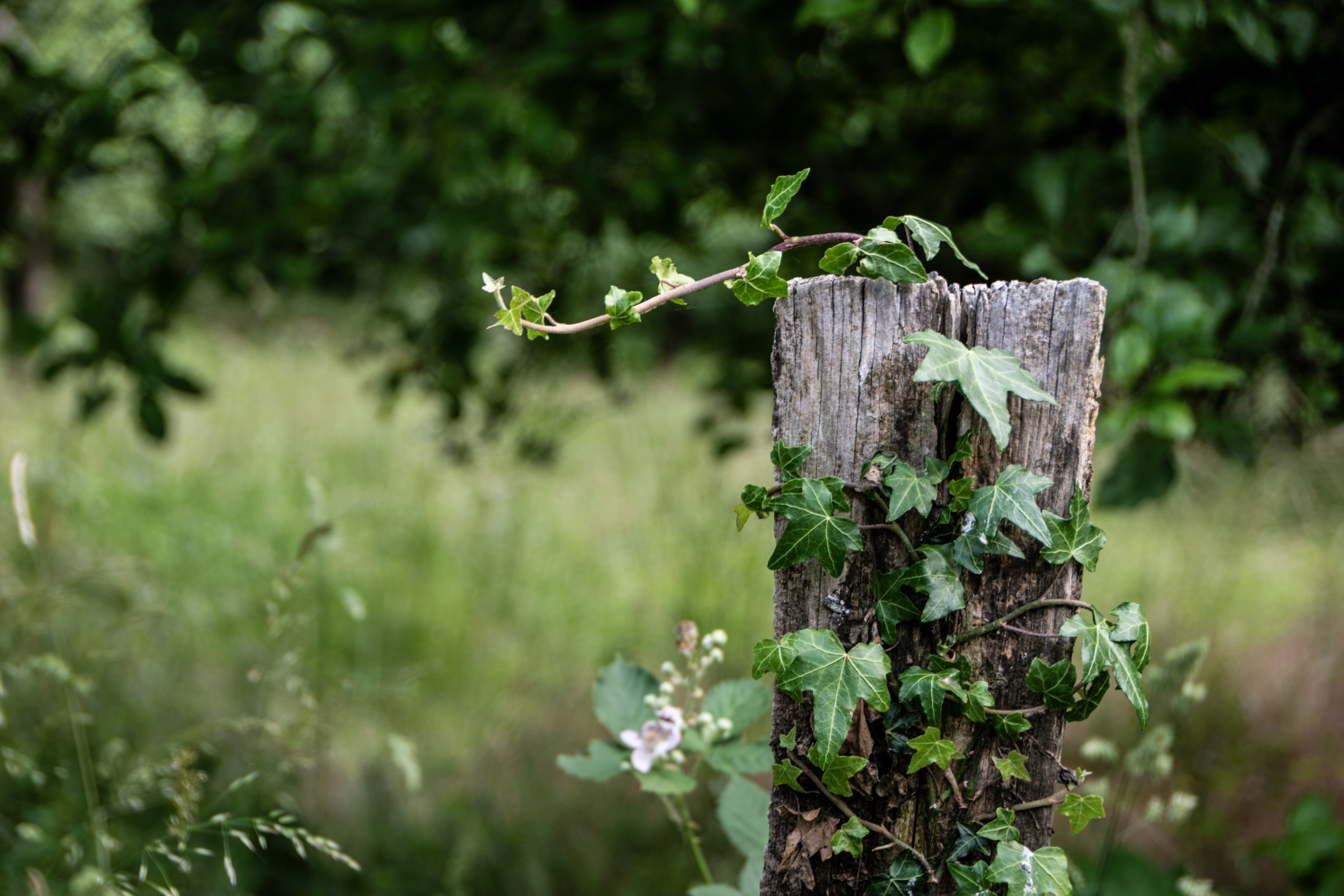
Common ivy climbing a fencepost in Hennef, Germany

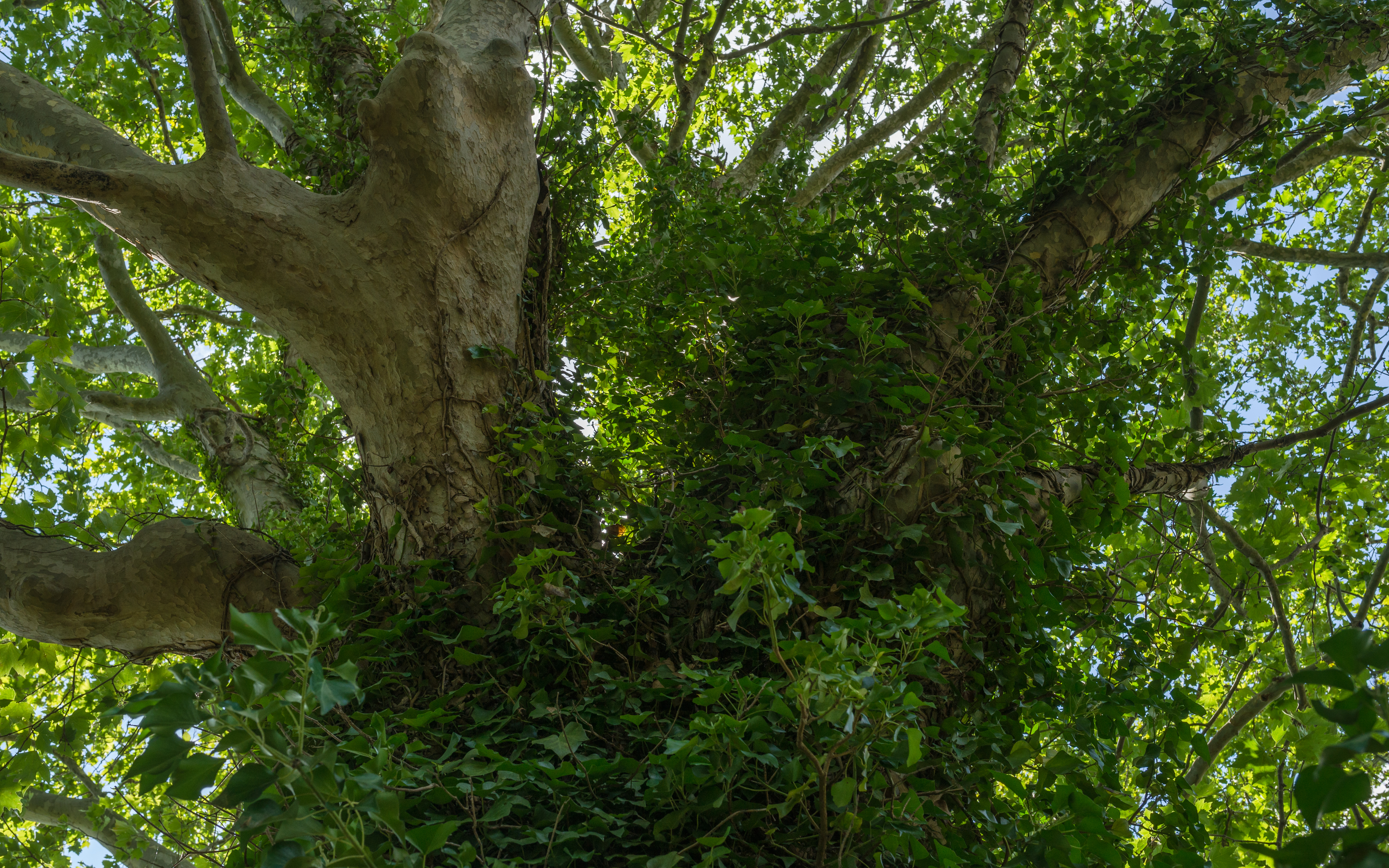
Common ivy clinging on a London plane in Agde, France

The range of Hedera helix is from Ireland northeast to southern Scandinavia, south to Portugal, and east to Ukraine, Iran and northern Turkey. In Britain, it is very common and widespread, but absent from the Isle of Man and Channel Islands.

The northern and eastern limits are at about the −2 °C (28 °F) winter isotherm, while to the west and southwest, it is replaced by other species of ivy. Hedera helix itself is much more winter-hardy and survives temperatures of −23.3 °C (−9.9 °F) (USDA Zone 6a) and above.

== Invasive species ==
Like other exotic species, ivy has predominantly been spread by human action. H. helix is labeled as an invasive species in parts of the world.

=== Australia ===
The Centre for Invasive Species Solutions lists Hedera helix as a weed across southern, especially south-eastern Australia, and local councils provide advice on how to remove it and limited services for removal. It is officially scheduled as a weed in Western Australia and the Australian Capital Territory. Hedera helix is the only species of ivy bearing the legal status of 'declared weed' in Australia; however, it may be the case that much of what is identified as invasive "English Ivy" in Australia is in reality Hedera hibernica.

=== Canada ===
Although common as a winter holiday decoration, H. helix is invasive and is a pathogen alternate host in British Columbia.

=== New Zealand ===
H. helix has been listed as an "environmental weed" by the Department of Conservation since 1990.

=== United States ===
In the United States, H. helix is considered weedy or invasive in a number of regions and is on the official noxious weed lists in Oregon and Washington, with its sale being banned in both states. Like other invasive vines such as kudzu, H. helix can grow to choke out other plants and create "ivy deserts". State- and county-sponsored efforts are encouraging the destruction of ivy in forests of the Pacific Northwest and the Southern United States. Ivy can easily escape from cultivated gardens and invade nearby parks, forests and other natural areas via squirrels and birds.

=== Control, eradication, and recovery ===
Once ivy is established it is very difficult to control or eradicate. If left untreated it will crowd out other ground cover plants and can choke out and kill shrubs and overstory trees.

Tested and successful methods of control are mechanical removal and chemical applications. Chemical eradication includes the use of 2,4-D amine, glyphosate, and metsulfuron, with metsulfuron being the most effective on H. helix. Mechanical removal typically involves hand pulling and has been found to be more environmentally beneficial in the long term than chemical removal. A study has shown that after removal, seed addition significantly increased species richness, diversity, and density on pulled ivy, while seed addition had no benefits on chemically sprayed ivy. This is likely due to the dead roots still occupying the soil after spraying, which are removed when pulling.

After mechanical removal, the recovery of native species can be significant after one year from resprouting and germination. However, ivy produces fruits that can be spread by birds, so continuous management after recovery is still necessary to prevent invasion from recurring in the same location or nearby.

One study found that during the next growing season after H. helix removal, herbaceous native plants were more abundant and diverse, while shrubs and ferns had either no increase or a decrease in abundance and diversity. This can be due to herbaceous plants having viable seeds buried in the soil, while ferns are slow-growing, and existing shrubs may not bear seeds from limited sunlight in the forest.

Areas of invasion can be identified using LiDAR detection, which has been measured at around 82% accuracy, with better accuracy in places with less canopy cover.

=== Damage to trees ===
Ivy can climb into the canopy of young or small trees in such density that the trees fall over from the weight, a problem that does not normally occur in its native range. In its mature form, dense ivy can destroy habitat for native wildlife and creates large sections of solid ivy where no other plants can develop. It is also thought to be a reservoir for leaf scorch bacteria. However, the UK Woodland Trust considers that it does not damage trees and hence does not require removal. The ivy also blocks the sun from the trees that need it for photosynthesis.

== Cultivation ==
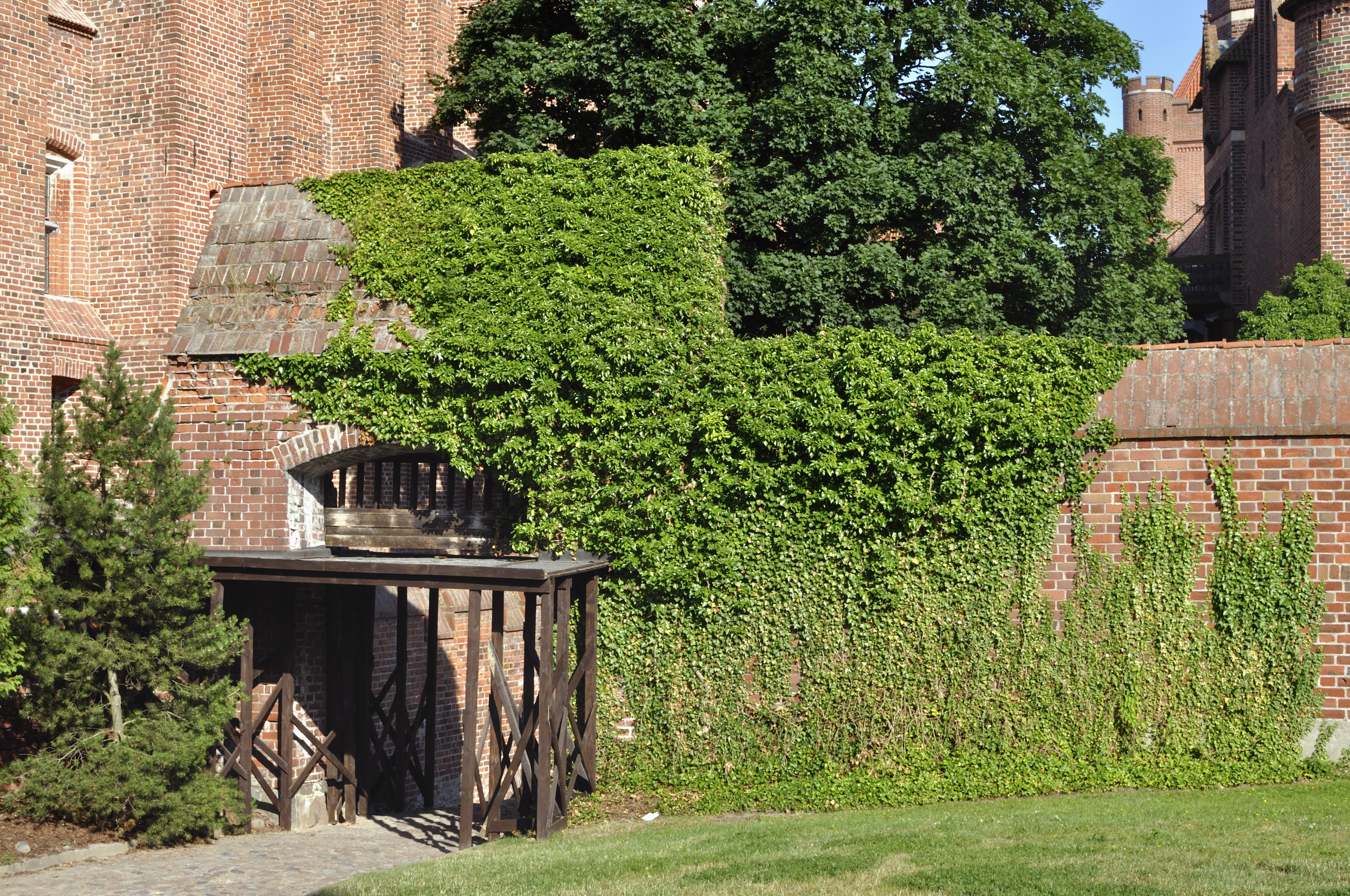
Ivy-covered entrance to Malbork Castle in Poland

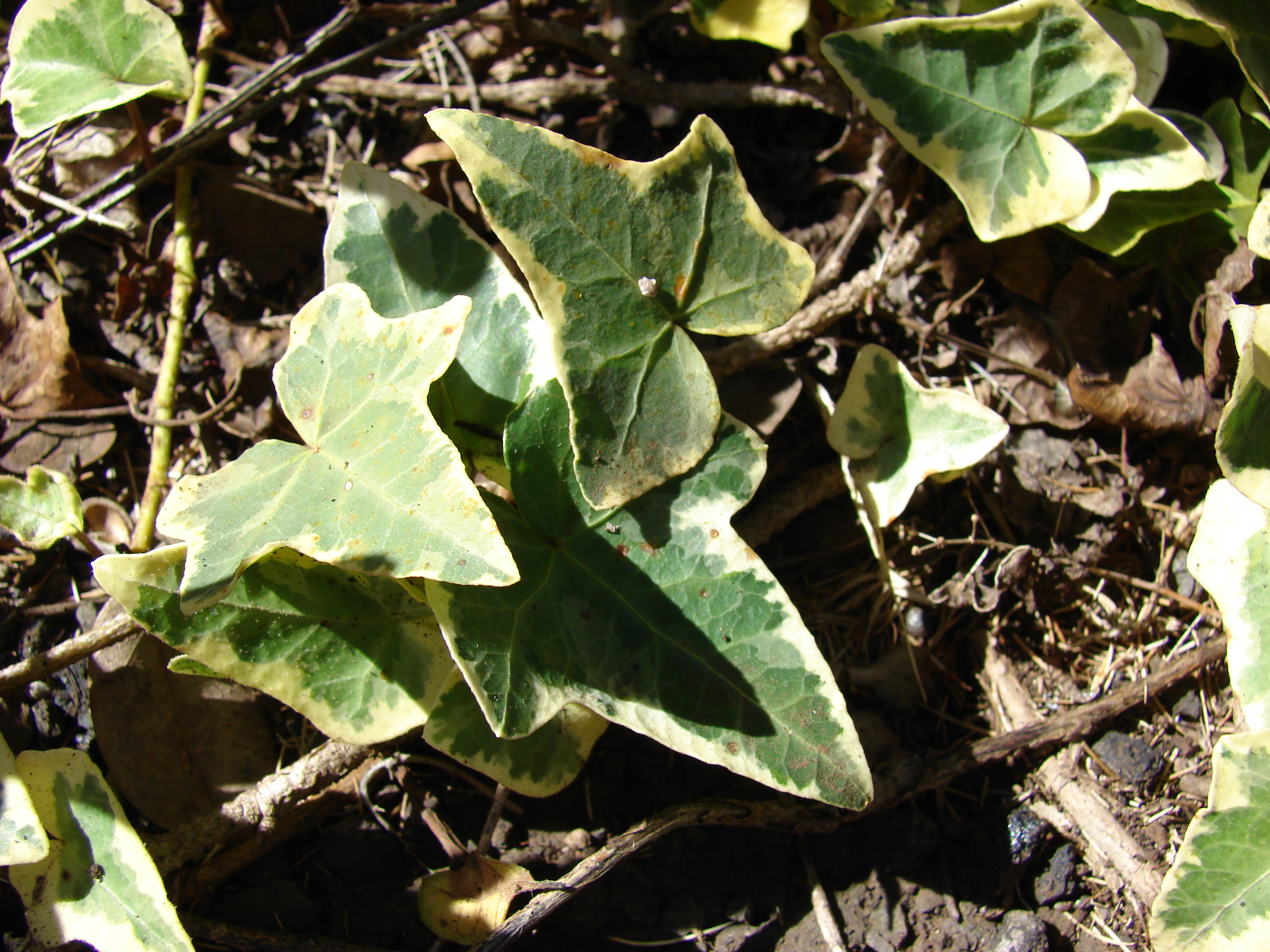
Variegated ivy leaves growing at the Enchanted Floral Gardens of Kula, Maui

Ivy is widely cultivated as an ornamental plant. Within its native range, the species is greatly valued for attracting wildlife. The flowers are visited by over 70 species of nectar-feeding insects, and the berries eaten by at least 16 species of birds. The foliage provides dense evergreen shelter, and is also browsed by deer.

In Europe, it is frequently planted to cover walls and the Bavarian government recommends growing it on buildings for its ability to cool the interior in summer, while providing insulation in winter, as well as protecting the covered building from soil moisture, temperature fluctuations and direct exposure to heavy weather. Further uses include weed suppression in plantings, beautifying unsightly facades and providing additional green by growing on tree trunks.

However, ivy can be problematic. It is a fast-growing, self-clinging climber that is capable of causing damage to brickwork, guttering, etc., and hiding potentially serious structural faults, as well as harbouring unwelcome pests. Careful planning and placement are essential.

=== Cultivars ===
Over 30 cultivars have been selected for leaf traits such as yellow, white, variegated (e.g. 'Glacier'), and deeply lobed (e.g. 'Sagittifolia'), and other traits like purple stems and slow, dwarfed growth.

The following 16 cultivars have gained the Royal Horticultural Society's Award of Garden Merit:

- 'Angularis Aurea'
- 'Buttercup'
- 'Caecilia'
- 'Ceridwen'
- 'Congesta'
- 'Duckfoot'
- 'Glacier'
- 'Goldchild'
- 'Golden Ingot'
- 'Maple Leaf'
- 'Manda's Crested'
- 'Midas Touch'
- 'Parsley Crested'
- 'Shamrock'
- 'Spetchley'
- 'White Knight'

== Toxicity and medical uses ==
Ivy berries are somewhat poisonous to humans, but extracts from ivy leaves are part of current cough medicines. A 2020 evidence review found that H. helix preparations "may be a therapeutic option for treating early symptoms of respiratory tract infections", saying that "the best effectiveness for H. helix preparations has been proven for coughing, as an expectorant and to reduce the frequency and intensity of cough. Only weak evidence was found for all other researched symptoms." In the past, the leaves and berries were taken orally as an expectorant to treat cough and bronchitis. In 1597, the British herbalist John Gerard recommended water infused with ivy leaves as a wash for sore or watering eyes.

The leaves can cause severe contact dermatitis in some people. People who have this allergy (strictly a type IV hypersensitivity) are also likely to react to carrots and other members of the Apiaceae as they contain the same allergen, falcarinol.

Previous studies showed that the H. helix extract contains α-hederin and β-hederin, falcarinol, didehydrofalcarinol, rutin, caffeic acid, chlorogenic acid, emetine, nicotiflorin, hederasaponin B and hederacoside C. However, only three extracted components were detectable more than 1.5% in the Hedera helix leaves (hederacoside C 15.69%, chlorogenic acid 2.07%, and rutin 1.62%). Other components were detectable in very few amounts (< 1%) or not detectable in some studies.

Owing to the large number of saponins in the leaves and fruits of H. helix, it is mildly poisonous to animals like rabbits and can lead to anemia.

In a hunting session for resources, birds would restrict the number of ivy berries ingested because of the moderate toxicity. However, berries are taken in larger quantities in the spring once they have ripened and lost some of their toxicity.

Extract of H. helix is highly effective in resisting fire blight. It has been observed to significantly inhibit the fire blight pathogen E. amylovora for up to 7 days, with similar effectiveness as applying acibenzolar-S-methyl.

== Use as building façade ==
When used as a building façade, ivy provides both insulation and weather protection. Its roots dry the soil due to frequent need for water, inhibiting moisture on walls, but its robust self-climbing rootlets can be problematic if not managed correctly, causing damage to mortar and leaving permanent gaps on surfaces.

Hedera helix grows vigorously and clings by means of fibrous roots, which develop along the entire length of the stems. These are difficult to remove, leaving an unsightly "footprint" on walls, and possibly resulting in expensive resurfacing work. Additionally, ivy can quickly invade gutters and roof spaces, lifting tiles and causing blockages. It also harbors mice and other creatures. The plants have to be cut off at the base, and the stumps dug out or killed to prevent regrowth.

With the insulating effects of Hedera helix, it can reduce the deterioration of limestone and other stone surfaces by protecting them from freezing events. H. helix may reduce the frequency of freezing events 26%, the duration of freezing events by 34%, and the severity of freezing events by 32%, along with a noticeable reduction of damage to the limestone material.

== Mechanism of attachment ==
Hedera helix is able to climb relatively smooth vertical surfaces, creating a strong, long lasting adhesion with a force of around 300 nN. This is accomplished through a complex method of attachment starting as adventitious roots growing along the stem make contact with the surface and extend root hairs that range from 20 to 400 μm in length. These tiny hairs grow into any small crevices available, secrete glue-like nanoparticles, and lignify. As they dry out, the hairs shrink and curl, effectively pulling the root closer to the surface.

The glue-like substance is a nano composite adhesive that consists of uniform spherical nanoparticles 50–80 nm in diameter in a liquid polymer matrix. Chemical analyses of the nanoparticles detected only trace amounts of metals, once thought to be responsible for their high strength, indicating that they are largely organic. Recent work has shown that the nanoparticles are likely composed in large part of arabinogalactan proteins (AGPs), which exist in other plant adhesives as well.
