= Umbel =

Type of inflorescence

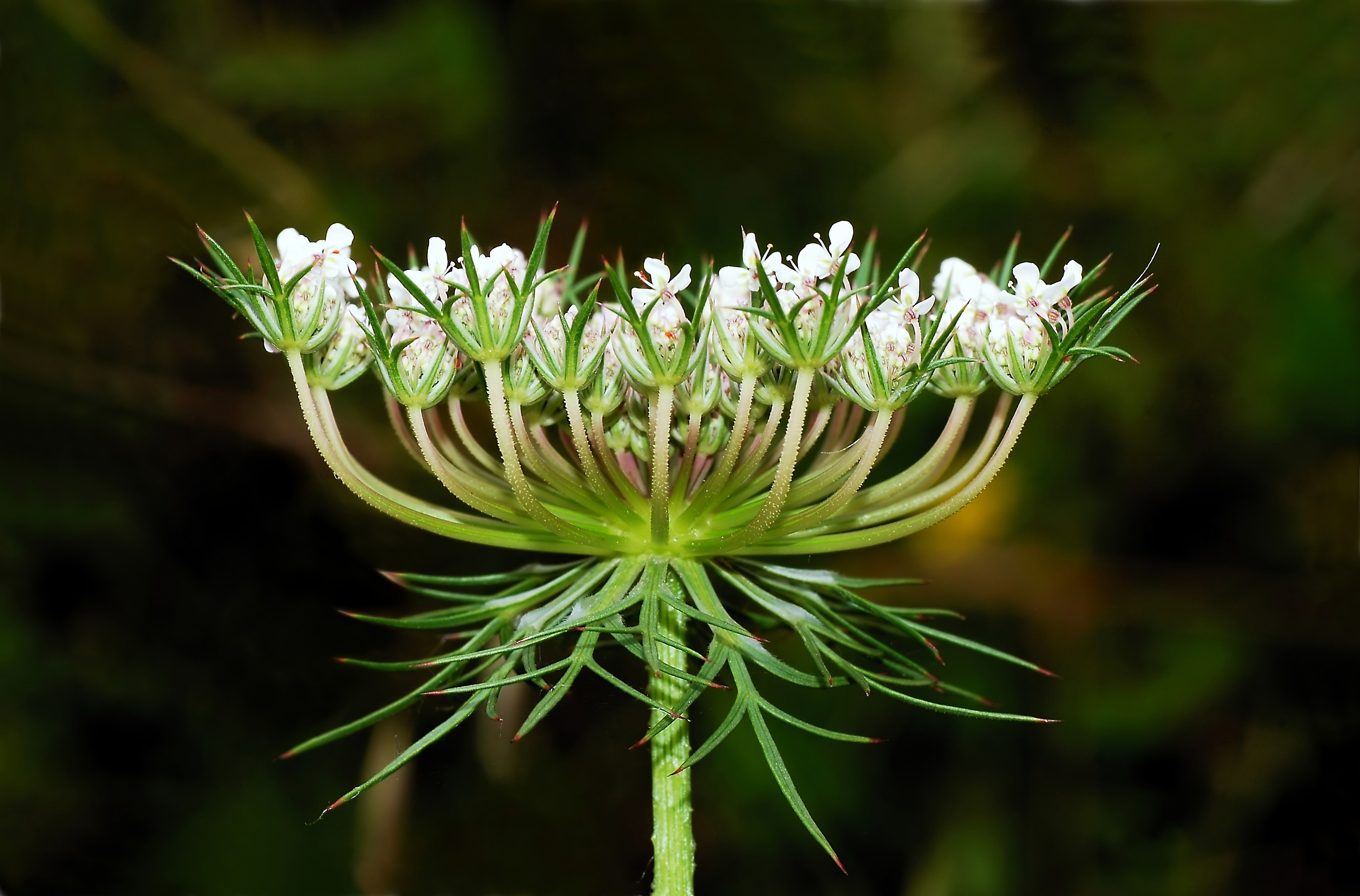
Compound umbel of a wild carrot, Daucus carota (Apiaceae)

In botany, an umbel is an inflorescence that consists of a number of short flower stalks (called pedicels) that spread from a common point, somewhat like umbrella ribs. The word was coined in botanical usage in the 1590s, from Latin umbella "parasol, sunshade". The arrangement can vary from being flat-topped to almost spherical. Umbels can be simple or compound. The secondary small umbels of compound umbels are known as umbellules or umbellets. The arrangement of the inflorescence in umbels is referred to as umbellate, or occasionally subumbellate (almost umbellate).

Umbels are a characteristic of plants such as carrot, parsley, dill, and fennel in the family Apiaceae; ivy, Aralia and Fatsia in the family Araliaceae; and onion (Allium) in the family Amaryllidaceae.

An umbel is a type of indeterminate inflorescence. A compressed cyme, which is a determinate inflorescence, is called umbelliform if it resembles an umbel.

== Gallery ==
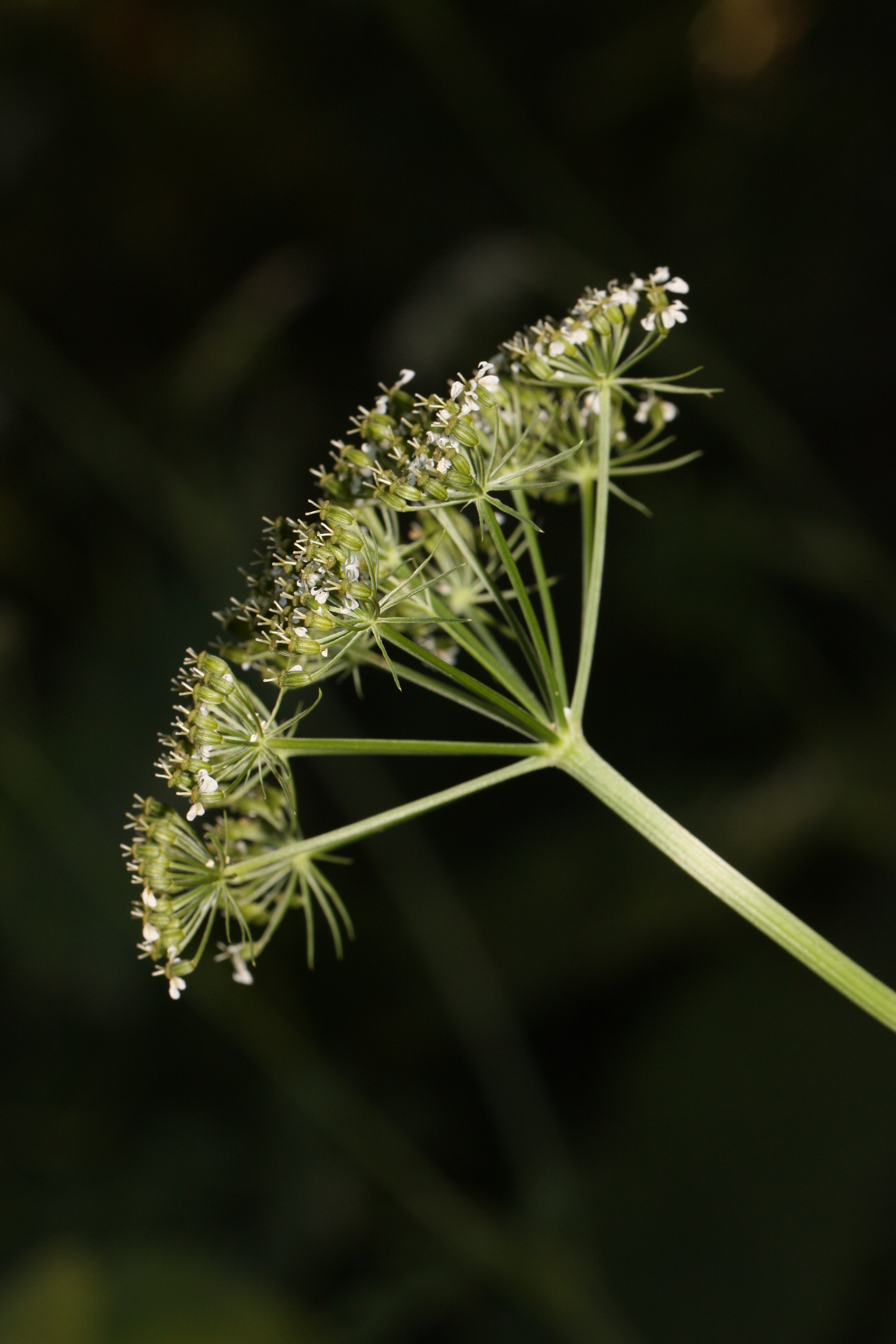
Compound umbel of a hemlock-parsley, Conioselinum pacificum (Apiaceae)

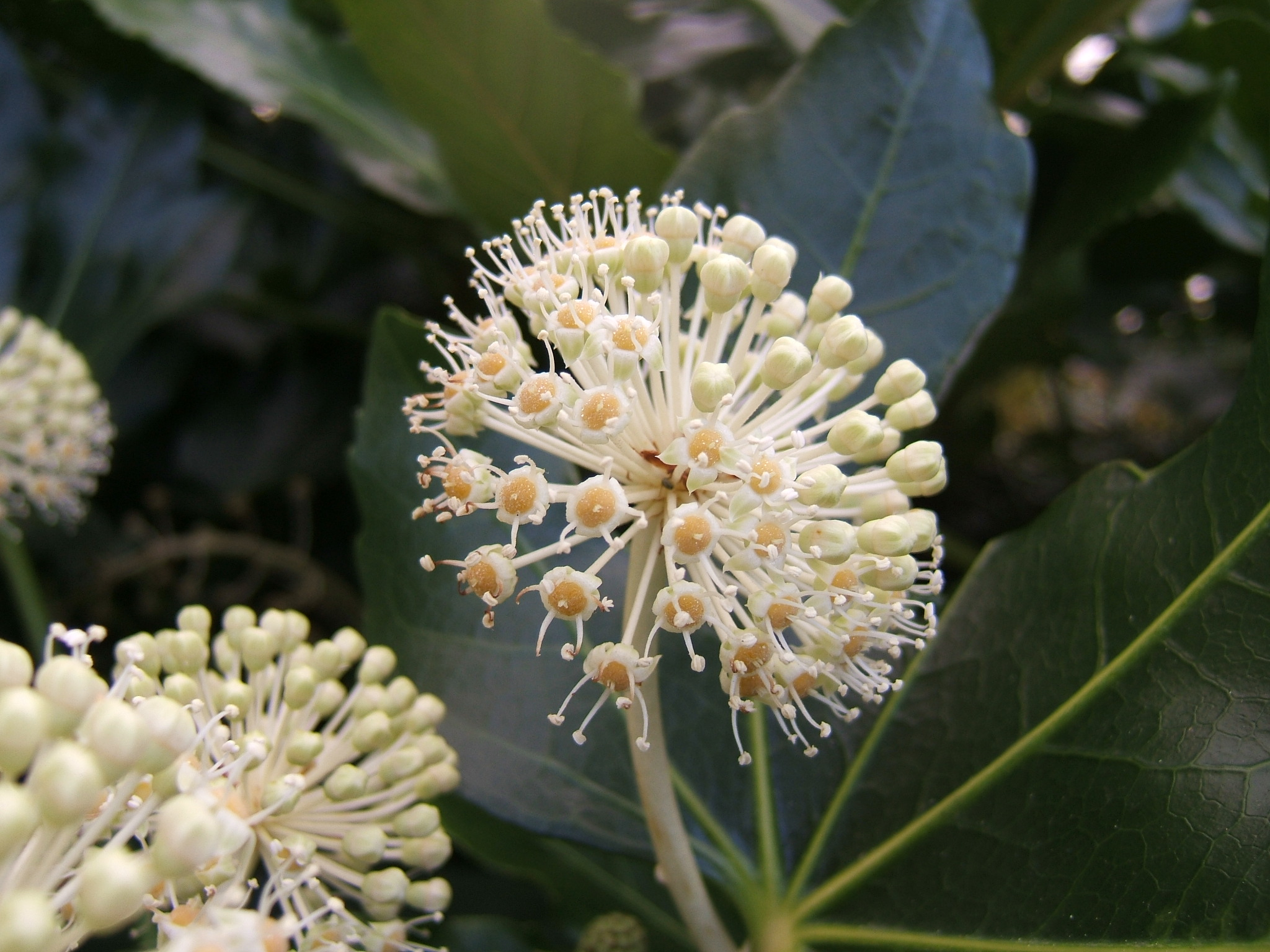
Simple umbel of Fatsia japonica (Araliaceae)

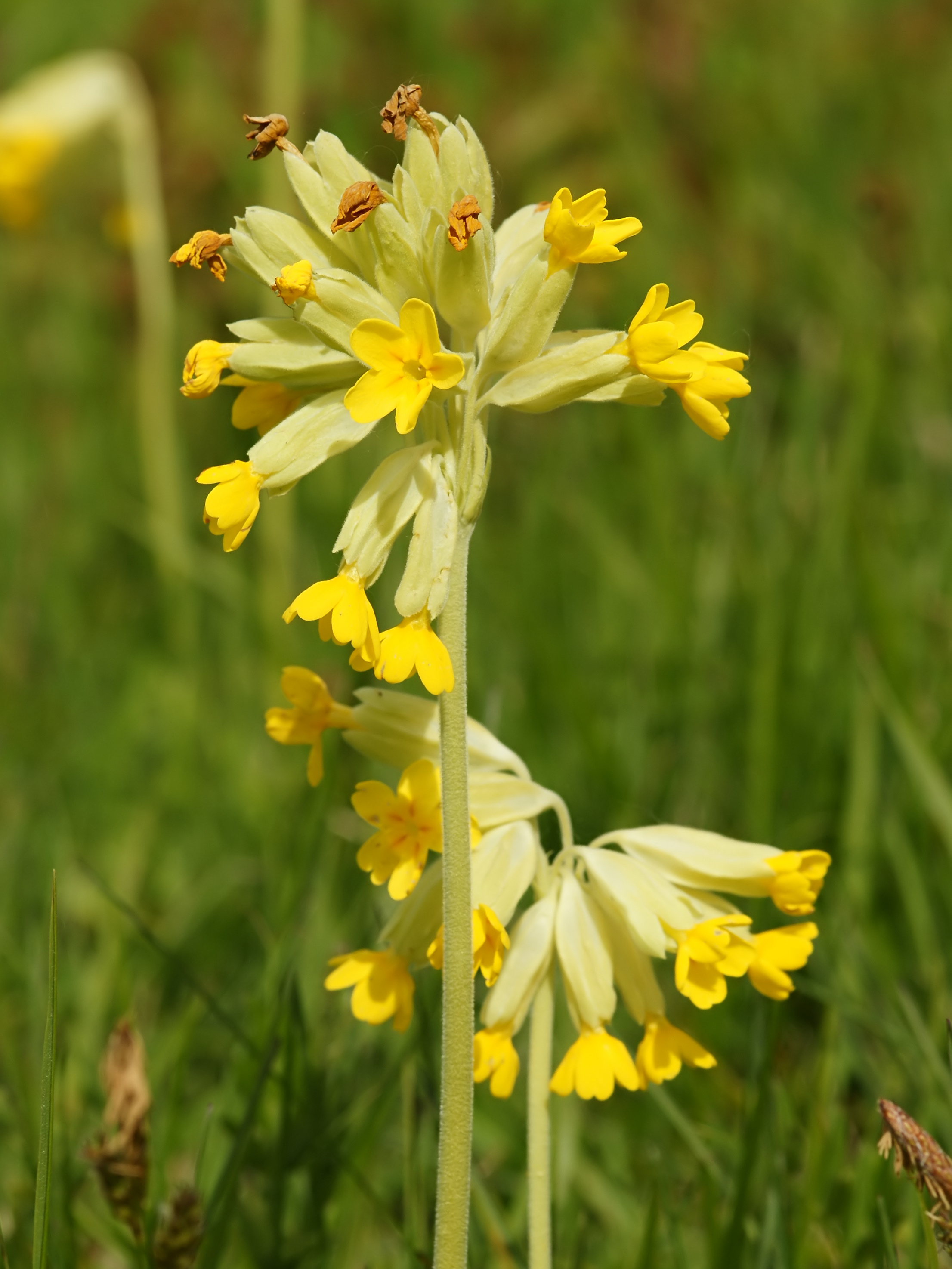
Simple umbels of Primula veris

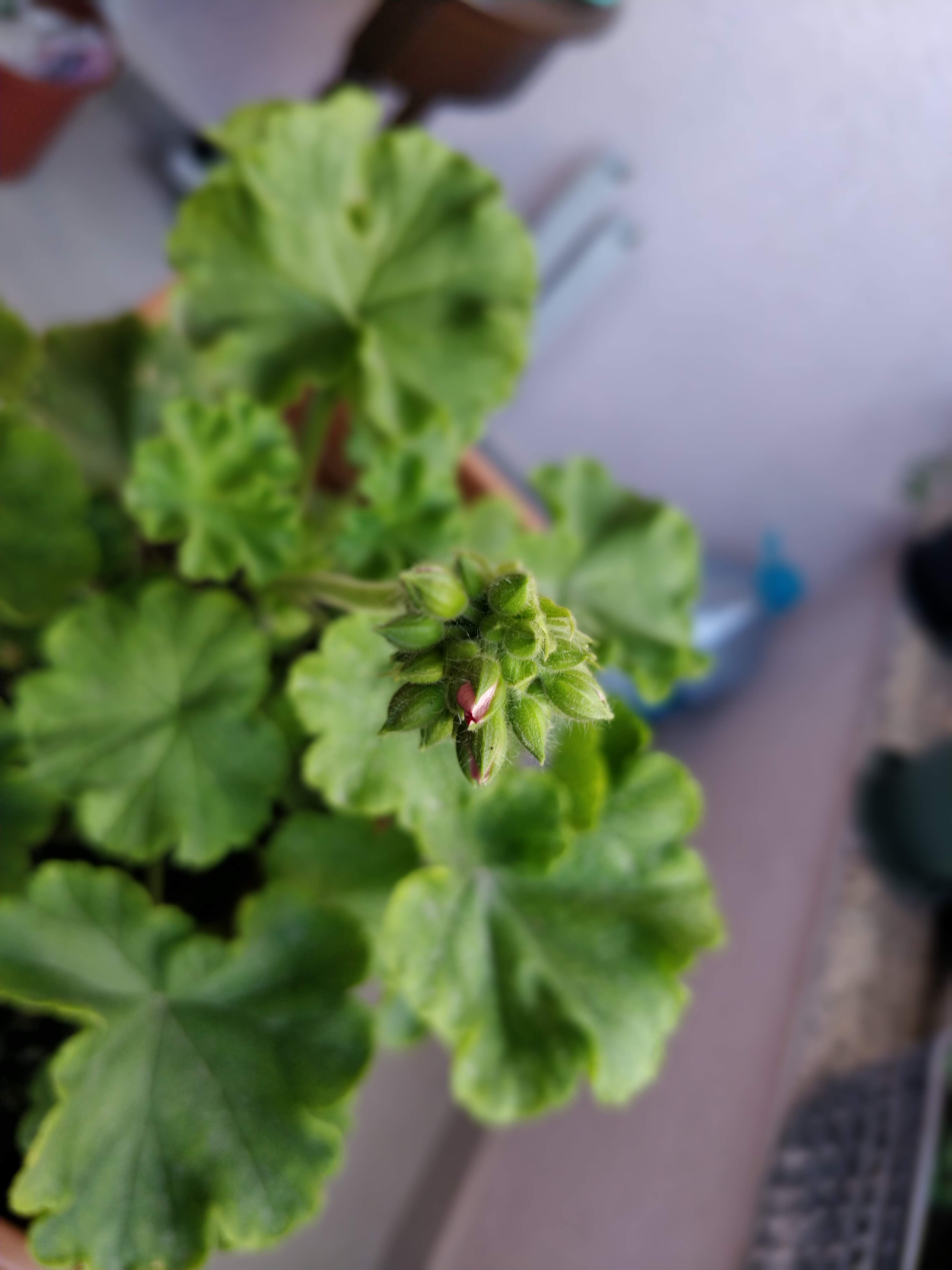
Umbel of a Pelargonium zonale

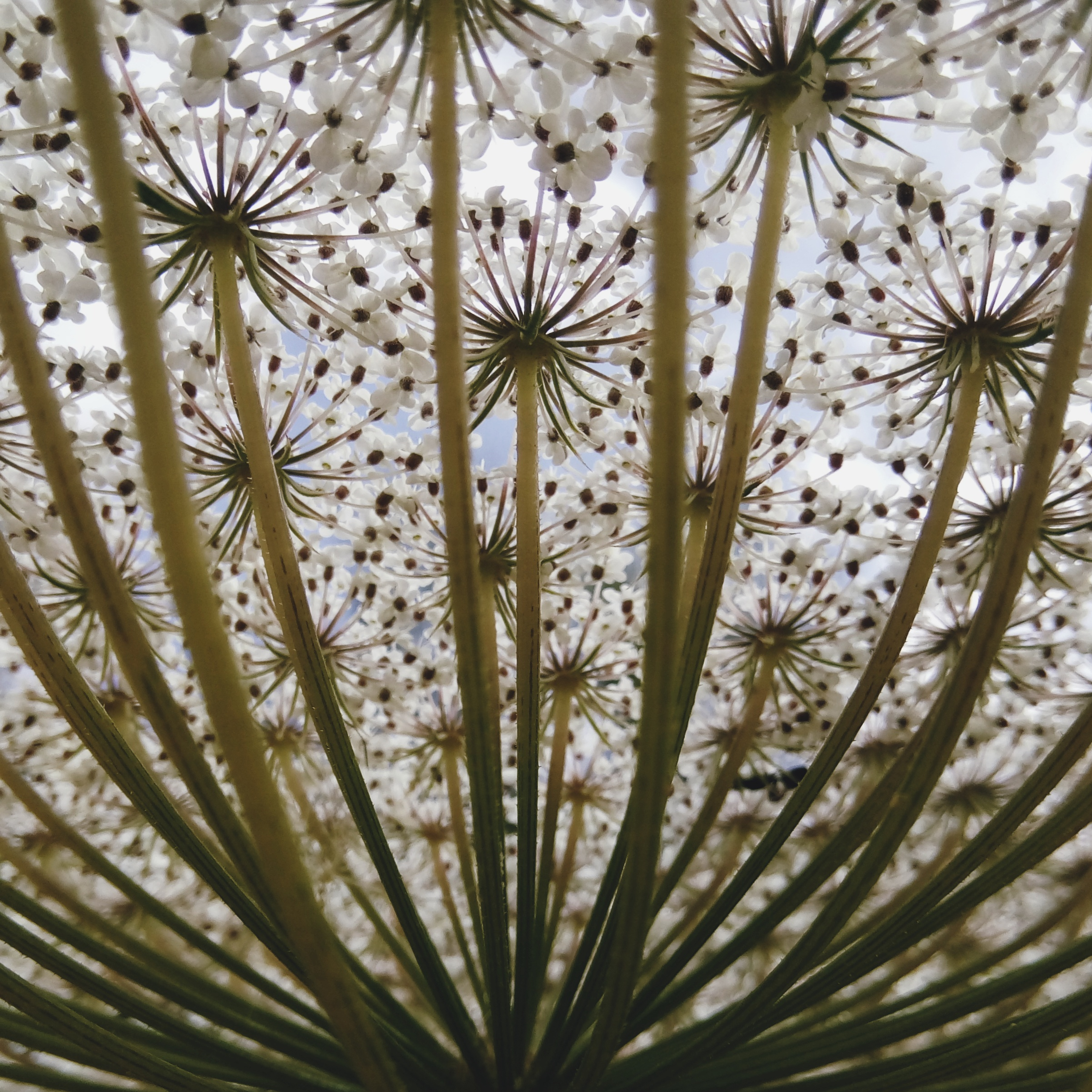
Daucus carota umbellets down view
