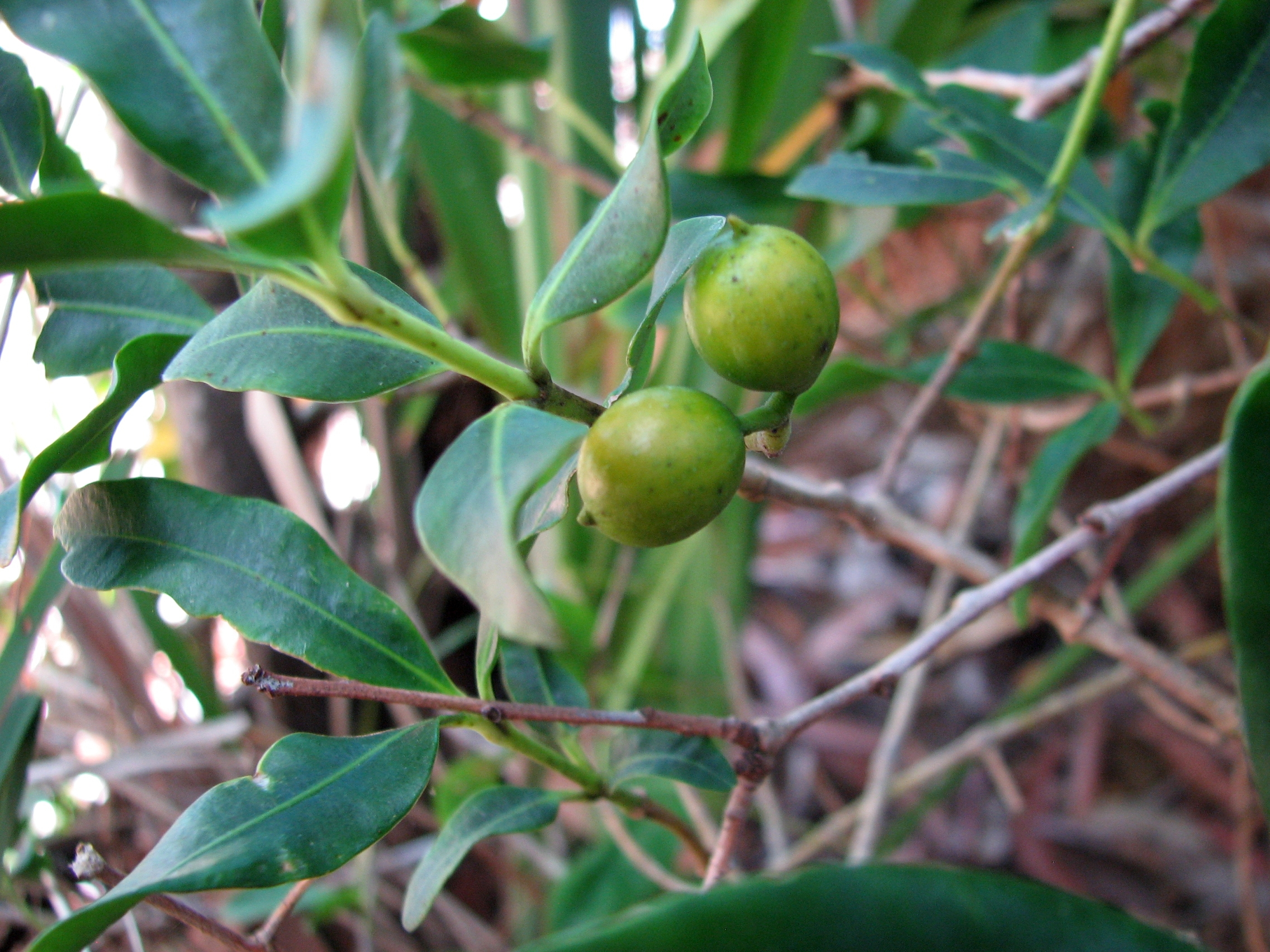
- Alyxia spicata with unripe fruit at Kewarra Beach, Queensland

Scientific classification
- Kingdom: Plantae
- Clade: Tracheophytes
- Clade: Angiosperms
- Clade: Eudicots
- Clade: Asterids
- Order: Gentianales
- Family: Apocynaceae
- Genus: Alyxia
- Species: A. spicata

Binomial name
- Alyxia spicata R.Br.

= Alyxia spicata =

Species of flowering plant

Alyxia spicata, commonly known as chain fruit, is a sprawling shrub or vine in the family Apocynaceae. It is native to New Guinea and the Australian tropics.

Plants may grow up to 4 metres (13 ft) high and have leaves in whorls of 4 on vertically growing shoots and whorls of 3 on horizontal shoots. Flowers usually have an orange tube with cream lobes and are 3 to 4 mm (0.12 to 0.16 in) in diameter with a hairy calyx. Fruits transition through yellow and orange and ultimately black upon ripening. These are around 10 mm (0.39 in) in diameter and may be joined like beads on a string.

The species was formally described in 1810 by Scottish botanist Robert Brown in Prodromus Florae Novae Hollandiae, based on a specimen collected at Vanderlin Island in the Gulf of Carpentaria. Plant material had earlier been collected at Cape Grafton and the Endeavour River during Lieutenant James Cook's first voyage of discovery in 1770 and illustrated by Sydney Parkinson. An illustration of the species was published in 1900 with the name Gynopogon spicatum in Illustrations of the Botany of Captain Cook's Voyage Round the World in H.M.S. "Endeavour" in 1768-71.

Alyxia spicata occurs naturally in rainforest, beach forest, vine thickets and on cliffs in New Guinea, the northernmost parts of Western Australia and the Northern Territory as well as north-east Queensland. It is found at altitudes ranging from sea level to 1,000 metres (3,300 ft).
