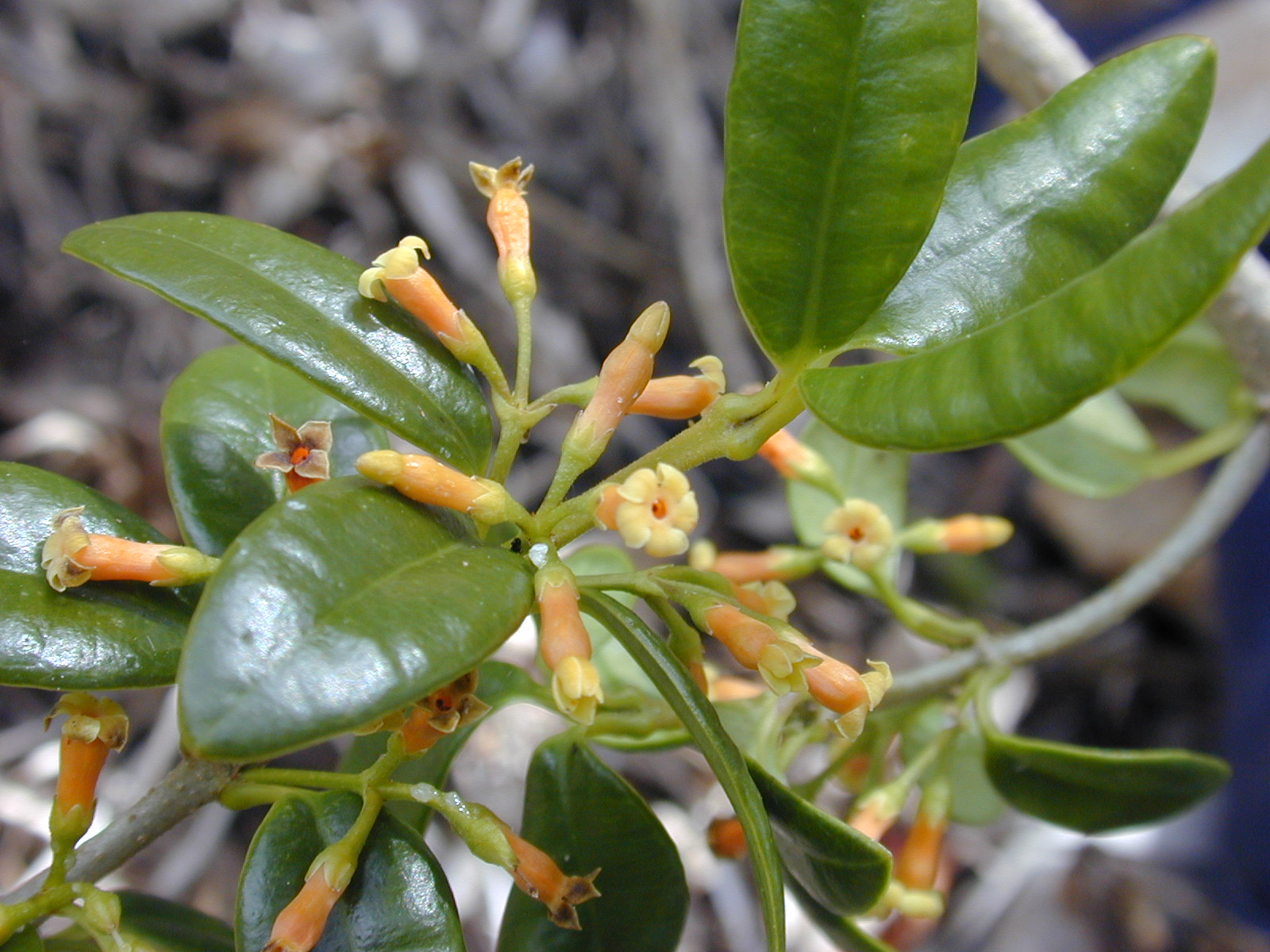

Conservation status
- Vulnerable (NatureServe)

Scientific classification
- Kingdom: Plantae
- Clade: Embryophytes
- Clade: Tracheophytes
- Clade: Spermatophytes
- Clade: Angiosperms
- Clade: Eudicots
- Clade: Asterids
- Order: Gentianales
- Family: Apocynaceae
- Genus: Alyxia
- Species: A. stellata

Binomial name
- Alyxia stellata (J.R. Forst. & G. Forst.) Roem. & Schult.

Synonyms
- 53 synonyms: Alyxia aromatica Reinw. ex E.A.Duchesne; Gynopogon stellatus J.R.Forst. & G.Forst.; Pulassarium stellatum (J.R.Forst. & G.Forst.) Kuntze; Alyxia amoena A.C.Sm.; Alyxia brevipes (Baill.) Schltr.; Alyxia elliptica Cheeseman; Alyxia fosbergii J.Florence; Alyxia intermedia Vieill. ex Guillaumin; Alyxia latilimba M.L.Grant; Alyxia linearifolia A.C.Sm.; Alyxia myrtillifolia (A.Gray ex Hillebr.) H.Lév.; Alyxia obtusifolia R.Br.; Alyxia oliviformis Gaudich.; Alyxia oliviformis f. ampla H.St.John; Alyxia oliviformis f. angusta H.St.John; Alyxia oliviformis f. cuneata H.St.John; Alyxia oliviformis f. elliptica H.St.John; Alyxia oliviformis f. fusiformis H.St.John; Alyxia oliviformis f. lanceolata H.St.John; Alyxia oliviformis var. lanceolata Hillebr.; Alyxia oliviformis f. linearis H.St.John; Alyxia oliviformis f. myrtillifolia (A.Gray ex Hillebr.) H.St.John; Alyxia oliviformis var. myrtillifolia A.Gray ex Hillebr.; Alyxia oliviformis f. obovata H.St.John; Alyxia oliviformis f. ovata (Hillebr.) H.St.John; Alyxia oliviformis var. ovata Hillebr.; Alyxia oliviformis f. retusa H.St.John; Alyxia oliviformis f. rotundata H.St.John; Alyxia oliviformis f. subacuta H.St.John; Alyxia palauensis Markgr.; Alyxia scandens (J.R.Forst. & G.Forst.) Roem. & Schult.; Alyxia stellata var. amoea (A.C.Sm.) A.C.Sm.; Alyxia stellata var. deckeri Fosberg & Sachet; Alyxia stellata var. fatuhivensis Fosberg & Sachet; Alyxia stellata f. magnacarpa F.Br.; Alyxia stellata f. marquesensis F.Br.; Alyxia stellata var. marquesensis (F.Br.) Fosberg & Sachet; Alyxia stellata f. rapensis F.Br.; Alyxia sulcata Hook. & Arn.; Alyxia thozetii F.Muell.; Alyxia torresiana Gaudich.; Gynopogon apolimae Rech.; Gynopogon brevipes Baill.; Gynopogon oliviformis (Gaudich.) A.Heller; Gynopogon oliviformis var. ovata (Hillebr.) Hochr.; Gynopogon scandens J.R.Forst. & G.Forst.; Gynopogon torresianus (Gaudich.) K.Schum. & Lauterb.; Pulassarium obtusifolium (R.Br.) Kuntze; Pulassarium oliviformis (Gaudich.) Kuntze; Pulassarium scandens (J.R.Forst. & G.Forst.) Kuntze; Pulassarium sulcatum (Hook. & Arn.) Kuntze; Pulassarium thozetii (F.Muell.) Kuntze; Pulassarium torresianum (Gaudich.) Kuntze

= Alyxia stellata =

Species of plant

Alyxia stellata, known as maile in Hawaiian, is a species of flowering plant in the dogbane family, Apocynaceae, that is native to the tropical Pacific from Queensland, Australia, to Hawaii, USA. It grows as either a twining liana, scandent shrub, or small erect shrub, and is one of the few vines that are endemic to the islands. The leaves are usually ternate, sometimes opposite, and can show both types on the same stem. Flowers are quite inconspicuous and have a sweet and light fragrance of honey. The bark is most fragrant and exudes a slightly sticky, milky sap when punctured, characteristic of the family Apocynaceae. The entire plant contains coumarin, a sweet-smelling compound that is also present in vanilla grass (Anthoxanthum odoratum), woodruff (Galium odoratum) and mullein (Verbascum spp.). Fruit are oval and dark purple when ripe. Maile is a morphologically variable plant and the Hawaiian names reflect this (see Ethnobotany section).

== Distribution and habitat ==
Alyxia stellata ranges from northeastern Queensland to the tropical Pacific, including the Caroline Islands, Cook Islands, Fiji, Hawaiian Islands, Marianas, Marquesas, New Caledonia, Niue, Pitcairn Islands, Samoan Islands, Society Islands, Solomon Islands, Tonga, Tuamotu, Tubuai Islands, Vanuatu, and Wallis and Futuna.

Maile can occur in most types of vegetation at elevations from 50 to 2,000 metres (200 to 6,600 ft) on all of the main Hawaiian Islands, however it is believed that both Kahoʻolawe and Niʻihau likely had populations of the species before large-scale disturbances occurred. Lowland wet forests occur from 100–1,200 m (300–3,900 ft) elevation in the Hawaiian Islands and are prime habitat for maile, receiving 150–500 cm (60–200 in) of rainfall annually. Maile is also found in montane mesic and wet communities.

== Ethnobotanical uses ==
=== Lei ===
Maile is traditionally and still most popularly used in lei. The vines are prepared and twined together to make an open lei or if people prefer they can close it. In more rural areas it is typical for someone to pick their own maile if accessible, however because lei maile is so desirable, many floral shops carry these kinds of lei. It is one of the only endemic Hawaiian plants grown commercially for lei. Commercial maile plantations have become more common as some people feel that imported (non-Hawaiian) maile is not as fragrant as Hawaiian maile.

=== Lāʻau Lapaʻau ===
This plant was used medicinally to treat puho, puka puhi, kaupo, and na ʻeha moku kukonukonu e aʻe (other cuts). Maile kaluhea was mashed with ʻaukoʻi (Senna occidentalis) stalks, ʻahakea (Bobea spp.) and koa (Acacia koa) bark. After water is added to this mixture and heated, it is put on infected areas to clean.

=== Local tradition ===
Lei maile are often worn by the groom, and also by the groom's men in weddings which is a lovely sight. For high school proms in Hawaiʻi, the boy is often given a lei maile. Birthdays, graduations, anniversaries and any celebration for that matter are all an occasion for lei maile, however many responsible stewards to the land understand there is not enough maile to go around for everyone. This ties back in to local maile plantations that have started up.

=== Kapa ===
Kapa, pounded wauke (Broussonetia papyrifera) is traditionally scented using fragrant plants such as maile, mokihana (Melicope anisata), lauaʻe (Phymatosorus scolopendria), ʻiliahi (Santalum spp.) and kamani (Calophyllum inophyllum).

== Conservation ==
Because maile is desirable for harvesting it is often incorporated into restoration plantings which can help bring the community into the conservation process. One study looked at the potential of planting native Hawaiian plants as an understory layer to reduce weedy seedlings from sprouting up and gaining hold again in a restored area. Maile, māmaki (Pipturus albidus) and palapalai (Microlepia strigosa) were the plants used.

== Folklore ==
Mention of the maile plant occurs in various stories (moʻolelo), proverbs (ʻōlelo noʻeau), and in the song (mele) "Lei ʻAwapuhi".

=== Lāʻieikawai ===
The maile sisters are a favorite stock characters in Hawaiian romance tales. The story of Lāʻieikawai tells of five Maile sisters. Maile haʻi wale (brittle maile), Maile lau liʻi (small-leaved maile), Maile lau nui (large-leaved maile), Maile kaluhea (sweet-scented maile), and Maile pakaha (blunt-leaved maile). Kauai's maile lau liʻi is often celebrated in song and chant. The ʻōlelo noʻeau, Ka maile lau liʻi o Koʻiahi speaks of the "fine-leaved" maile of Kokeʻe, Kauaʻi which had one of the best and most fragrant maile lau liʻi in Hawaiʻi and was praised in old chants. Because maile was often placed on heiau in traditional times, the older generations of Hawaiians say that the fragrance of maile still lingers in those areas where heiau once stood or are still standing.

=== Puna and Panaʻewa ===
Several ʻōlelo noʻeau from the Hilo and Puna districts on Hawaiʻi Island paint a wonderfully fragrant picture of Puna and Panaʻewa. Ka makani hali ʻala o Puna, the fragrance-bearing wind of Puna; Lei Hanakahi i ke ʻala me ke onaona o Panaʻewa, Hanakahi is adorned with the fragrance and perfume of Panaʻewa. These were both places that had a moist climate suitable for maile and other fragrant ferns, as well as the famous hala (Pandanus tectorius) from Puna. The phrase Puna paia ʻala, fragrant walls of Puna, gives reference to the hīnano blossom which was famously hung inside hale of that district to scent the house. People traveled to both Puna and Panaʻewa in order to pick maile, hence those areas being remembered as fragrant.

=== Mōlī ===
Mary Kawena Pukui tells a story from Kaʻū on Hawaiʻi Island of a beautiful young woman, Mōlī, whose father will let none other than a fisherman marry her (a good fisherman is well liked and prosperous because of the food he catches; it is also a sign of a much desired hard-working man). A certain worthless fisherman who tricked Mōlī's father by rubbing fish guts (which were thrown out by others) on himself took her hand in marriage and did no work afterwards. Driven to desperation, Mōlī decorated herself with a beautiful lei of ginger (Zingiber zerumbet), fern and maile and threw herself over the cliffs at Waiʻahukini. It is said each year around the time of her death, Mōlī returns and when the wind blows, moaning and wailing can be heard. The maile fragrance of her lei can also be smelled and if anyone goes there wearing a maile lei, they will be knocked to the ground.

=== Keaoua Kekuaokalani ===
Keaoua Kekuaokalani, a cousin to Liholiho (Kamehameha II), objected to the overturn of the kapu system and with supporters, they gathered together with weapons at the battle of Kuamoʻo in attempt to restore the kapu taken away. Hawaiians from the area where the battle took place hold that the fragrance of maile worn by the Kekuaokalani's warriors into battle can still be smelled.
