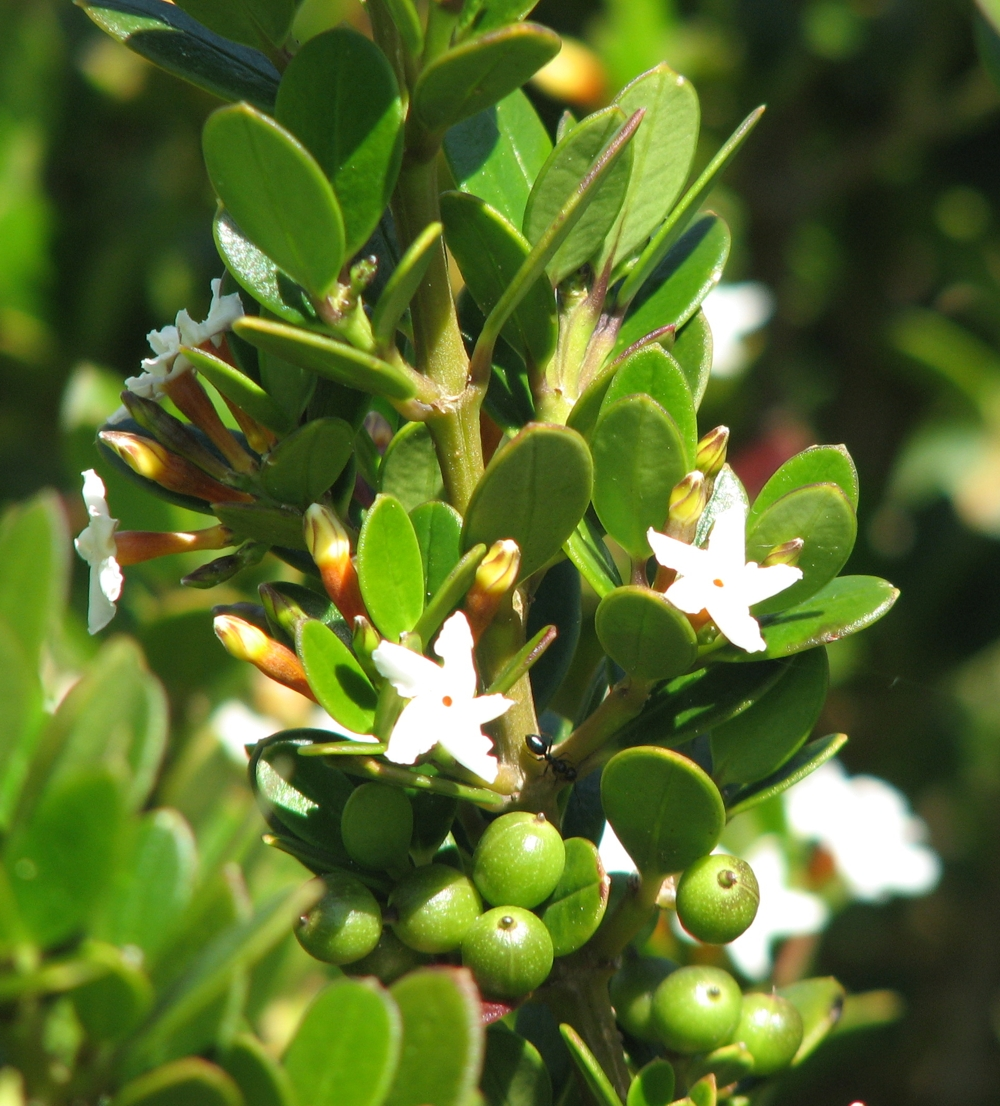
- Alyxia buxifolia at Loch Ard Gorge, Victoria, Australia

Scientific classification
- Kingdom: Plantae
- Clade: Tracheophytes
- Clade: Angiosperms
- Clade: Eudicots
- Clade: Asterids
- Order: Gentianales
- Family: Apocynaceae
- Genus: Alyxia
- Species: A. buxifolia

Binomial name
- Alyxia buxifolia R.Br.

= Alyxia buxifolia =

Species of plant

Alyxia buxifolia, otherwise known as the sea box or dysentery bush, is a species of evergreen shrub in the family Apocynaceae.

Alyxia buxifolia has medium to dark green foliage consisting of small, fleshy leaves. The flowers are small and twisted anticlockwise in a star shape. They are orange at the base of the petal and are a white-cream colour at the tip of the petal. It flowers in spring through to autumn. Alyxia buxifolia produces small fruits that are red to orange in colour when ripe.

Alyxia buxifolia has several synonyms though the current accepted name is Alyxia buxifolia R. Br.

It is found naturally occurring throughout southern Australia and can be found in Western Australia, South Australia, Victoria, Tasmania, New South Wales. Alyxia buxifolia occurs in coastal regions, often being found in scrub and heathland ecosystems. It can grow in many types of soils and is considered a hardy plant due to being tolerant of wind, salt, and some frost conditions. Alyxia buxifolia also creates habitat for small animals and provides food for birds and invertebrates.

The shrub also contains several compounds of interest which include oleanolic acids, ursolic acids, and betulinic acid.

It is used in many horticultural and landscape settings. It was also used by First Nations people of Australia to treat dysentery.

Alyxia buxifolia is currently considered not to be under threat.

== Description ==
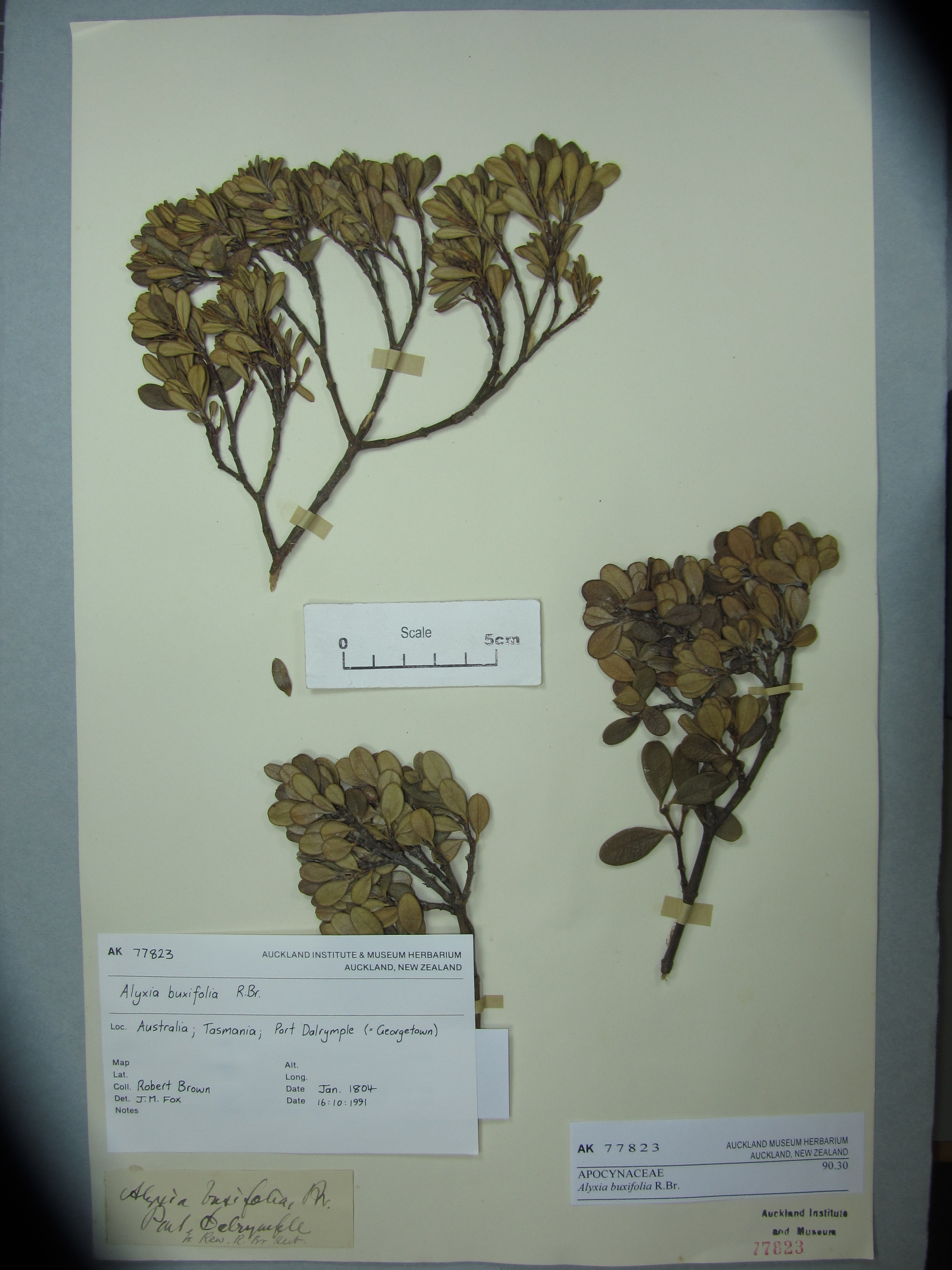
A dried specimen of leaves on a branch of an Alyxia buxifolia shrub

Alyxia buxifolia is a dense, woody shrub that can grow to 3 metres high and 3 metres wide. However, it is often found to be less than 50 cm tall due to harsh winds in it natural coastal habitats. It is a slow growing plant with a spreading growth habit.

Alyxia buxifolia's leaves are a medium to dark green colour on the upwards facing side. The undersides of the leaves are a pale green. Its leaves are thick and have a smooth and leathery surface. They are often paired with the leaves on opposite sides of the stem, though they can also grow in groups of three. The leaves are elliptical to obovate in shape and are between 1 cm and 5.2 cm in length. They can be between 0.5 cm to 2.5 cm wide. The base of the leaf is cuneate shaped, which narrows towards the stem while the apex of the leaf ends is apiculate, ending in a short point. The leaves are also close to the stem of the plant, with the petiole between 0.1 cm and 0.5 cm in length.

The flowers of Alyxia buxifolia form in cymes. Its flowers are shaped in an anticlockwise twisted star shape with its petals fused at the base to form a corolla tube. The tips of the petals, also known as the corolla lobes, are white to cream in colour, while the corolla tube is orange. The flowers are sized between 0.4 cm to 0.5 cm in diameter and between 0.7 cm to 1.1 cm in length. There can be up to 8 flowers in an inflorescence with the central flower maturing first. Alyxia buxifolia flowers through spring and autumn, with most flowers occurring during October to December.

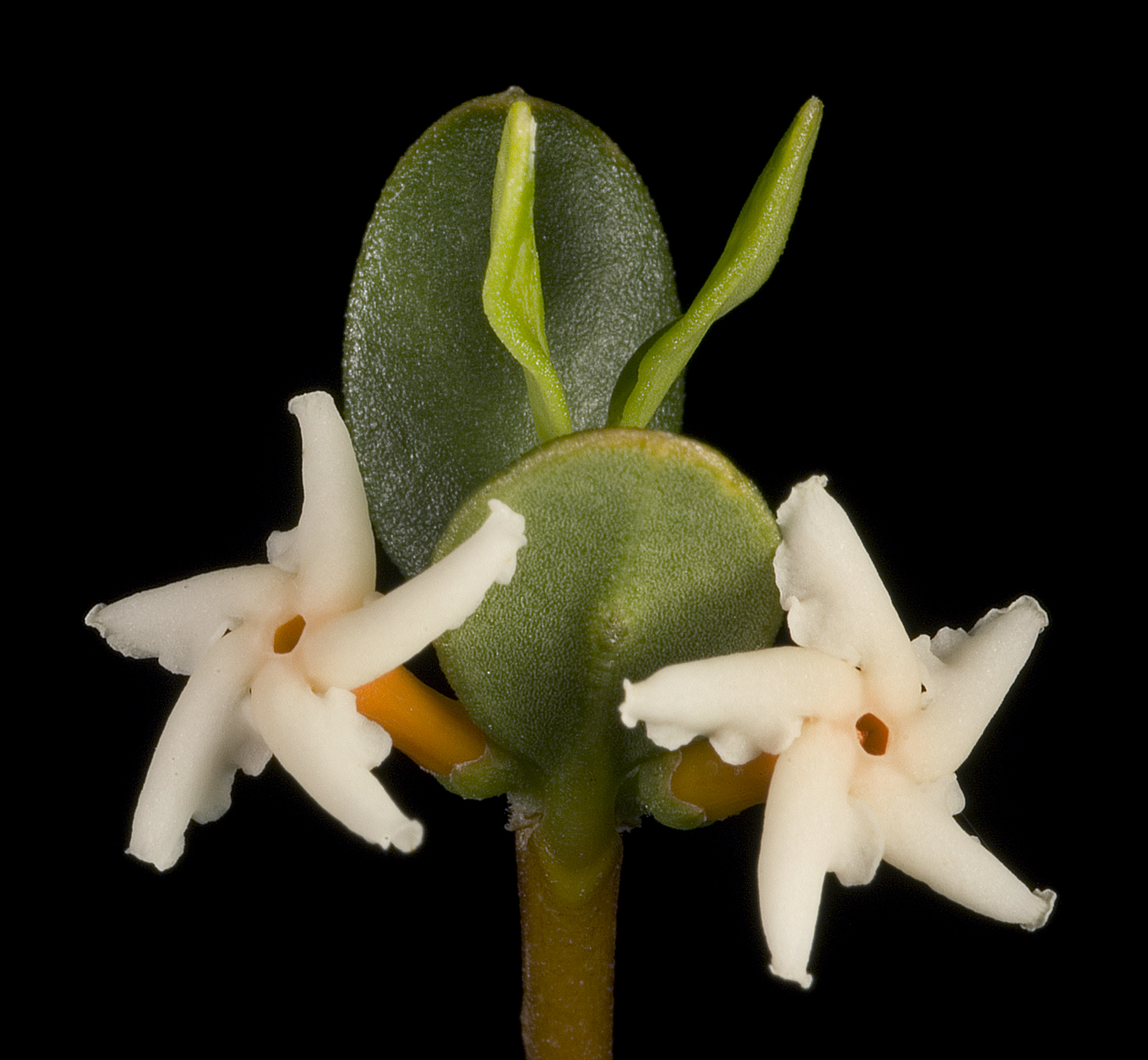
The flowers of the Alyxia buxifolia shrub.

Alyxia buxifolia has a dicot pollen grain arrangement. The grains have two large circular pores. The pollen grains are an uneven barrel shaped, with one side longer and less curved than the other. The pollen grains are considered large. The plants are considered hermaphrodites, with no unisexual flowers present.

Alyxia buxifolia has a drupe type fruit that is orange to red in colour when ripe. It is a small, ellipsoid shaped fruit ranging from 0.4 cm to 0.8 cm in diameter and 0.5 cm to 0.7 cm in length. It is typically one seeded. Generally, there are only one or two fruits produced per flower. The fruits are toxic to humans.

== Taxonomy ==
Alyxia buxifolia is one of the most widespread species within the Alyxia genus. Its current accepted name is Alyxia buxifolia R.Br which was published in 1810.

Alyxia buxifolia R. Br. has several synonyms; Alyxia buxifolia var. subacuta published in 1913, Gynopogon buxifolius R. Br. published in 1895, Pluassarium buxifolium R.Br. published in 1891, and Alyxia capitellata published in April, 1837.

== Habitat ==
Alyxia buxifolia can be found throughout southern Australia. Specifically, it is found along the coastal regions of the Far New South Wales South Coast and extends along the coast of Victoria It also grows along the Tasmanian North and North-Eastern coasts. In addition to being found in coastal areas of South Australia, it can also be found in inland areas, including the Nullarbor plains and Flinders Rangers. The shrubs can also been observed along coastal and inland areas in Southern regions of Western Australia.

Alyxia buxifolia can be found in a variety of different habitats. It is most commonly found in coastal ecosystems, particularly along sea cliffs, sand dunes, and areas exposed to strong winds. Alyxia buxifolia can also be found in inland areas that can range from high rainfall areas to low rainfall areas, including areas considered semi-arid. Within these regions, it is most often found in coastal heathlands and sand dune ecosystems. When in these ecosystems, it is often the dominant shrub type. It can also be found in several types of forests including littoral forests, Eucalypt forests, and open forests. It has also been observed growing in open to sparse scrublands, including mallee scrub ecosystems. The altitude that Alyxia buxifolia can grow in ranges from 0 m above sea level to 1000 m above sea level.

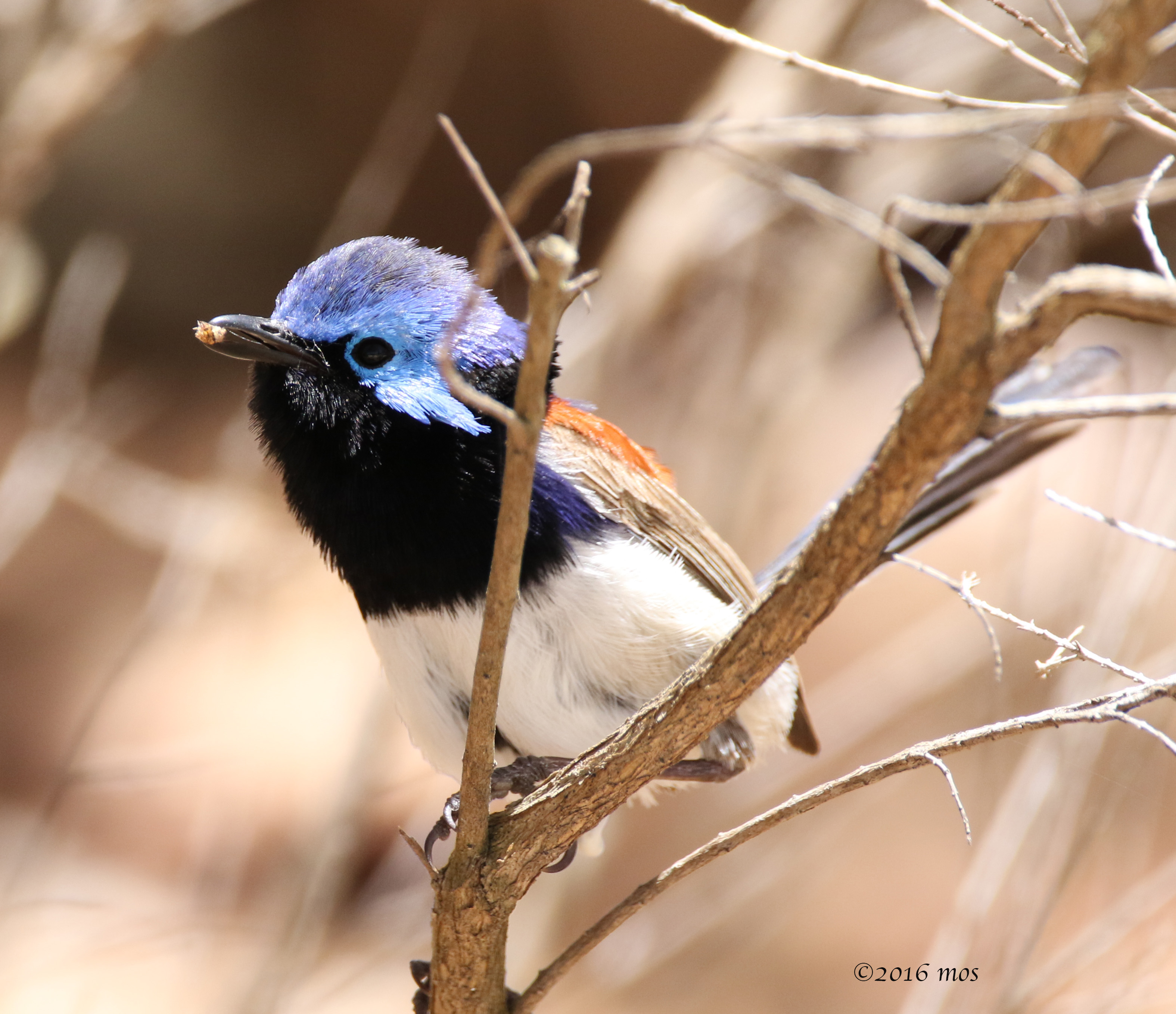
A blue breasted fairy wren. This species of bird can use the Alyxia buxifolia as habitat when existing within the same ecosystem or community.

Alyxia buxifolia is able to grow in a large variety of soils. It has been observed to be growing in sand, limestone and limestone derivative soils. It can also be found in loam type soils, including red loam and sandy yellow loam. It has also been observed to be growing in soils dominated by quartz rock. The soils where the Alyxia buxifolia can be found have neutral to alkaline pH levels.

Alyxia buxifolia is considered a hardy plant and is able to tolerate a variety of conditions that are unique to the coastal regions of Australia, including salt spray and drought. It is also able to tolerate mild frost conditions but is likely to be damaged in moderate to severe frost conditions.

== Ecology ==
Alyxia buxifolia provides habitat for many animals, including birds, such as blue-breasted fairy wrens, small mammals, and reptiles. Its fruits provide a food source for many coastal birds. The flowers of the Alyxia buxifolia produce nectar and pollen which provides food for invertebrates, including Australian native bees. The species is also a known host of a type of fungus called Puccinia alyxiae. It is also known to be parasitised by Alyxiaphagus picturatus.

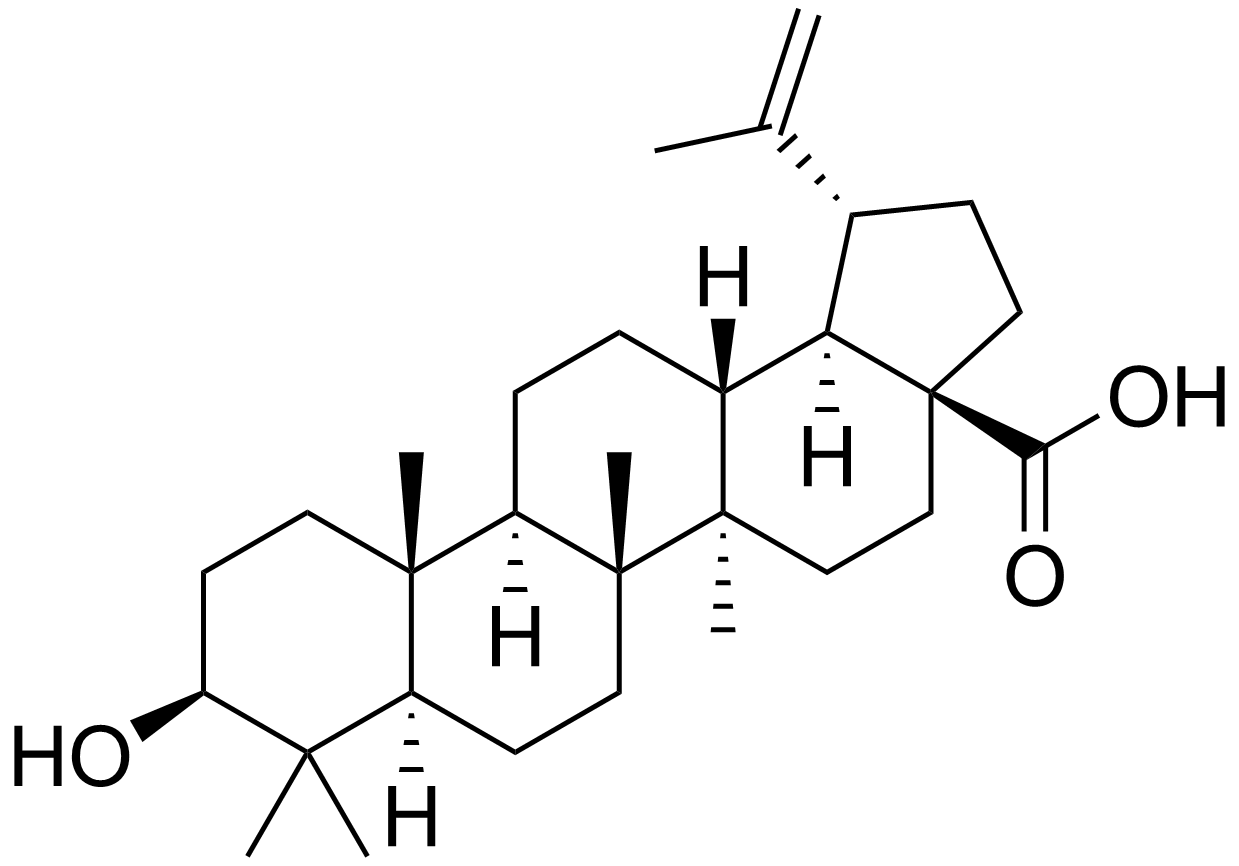
The chemical structure of betulinic acid, which can be found in Alyxia buxifolia shrubs growing in inland regions.

== Chemistry ==
The acids that Alyxia buxifolia contain differ depending on the location and habitat of the shrub. In coastal regions, Alyxia buxifolia contains oleanolic acids and ursolic acids. Shrubs further inland located in low rainfall areas contain betulinic acid.

== Uses ==
=== Horticulture ===
In horticulture and landscaping, Alyxia buxifolia is used as a hedge or a screen. It can be propagated through the use of newly harvested seeds or through cuttings. It can be difficult for the seeds to grow without treatment, with low rates of germination occurring in seeds without treatment. The highest rate of germination occurs in seeds that have been treated through bird droppings. The best time for seed collection occurs in November and December. It takes approximately 40 days for seeds to germinate from planting. When propagated through cuttings, Alyxia buxifolia will grow its roots slowly.

Alyxia buxifolia requires little additional irrigation outside of annual rainfalls. It will also attract birds and pollinating insects to areas where it is planted.

=== Indigenous Use ===
The bark of the Alyxia buxifolia shrub was used by the First Nations people of Australia to treat dysentery prior to colonisation.
