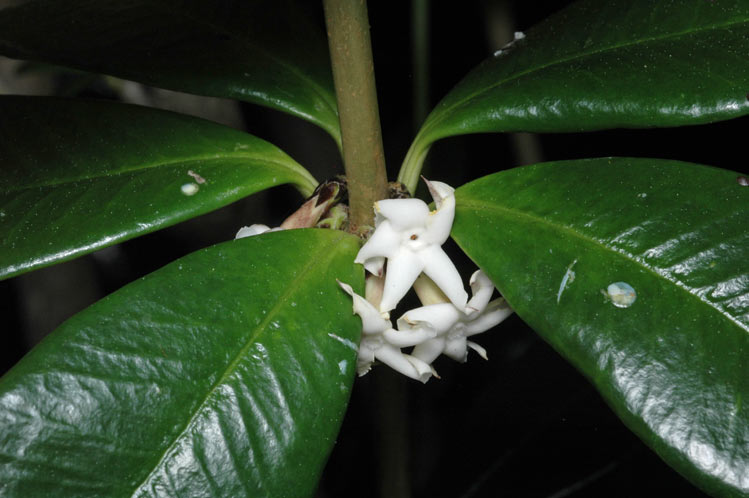
- Flowers

Conservation status
- Least Concern (NCA)

Scientific classification
- Kingdom: Plantae
- Clade: Tracheophytes
- Clade: Angiosperms
- Clade: Eudicots
- Clade: Asterids
- Order: Gentianales
- Family: Apocynaceae
- Genus: Alyxia
- Species: A. orophila

Binomial name
- Alyxia orophila Domin

= Alyxia orophila =

Species of flowering plant

Alyxia orophila, commonly known as chain fruit or mountain alyxia, is a species of plant in the oleander and frangipani family Apocynaceae. It is native to the Wet Tropics bioregion of Queensland, Australia, and was first described in 1928.

== Description ==
Alyxia orophila is a shrub growing to a height of about 5 m (16 ft). The leaves are stiff with a sharp point at the tip, and are arranged in whorls of three or four. They measure up to 5 cm (2.0 in) long and 2.5 cm (0.98 in) wide, the edges are curved downwards, and the lateral veins are obscure. The leaves and twigs produce a white sap when broken.

Flowers are produced in dense clusters and they measure up to 10 mm (0.39 in) wide and long. The fruits are drupes, usually with two connected end to end like beads on a string.

== Taxonomy ==
This species was first described by Czech botanist Karel Domin in 1928.

== Distribution and habitat ==
It occurs in mountain rainforest at altitudes from 1,100 to 1,500 m (3,600 to 4,900 ft), from Ngalba Bulal National Park south to Tully Falls National Park.

== Conservation ==
This species is listed as least concern under the Queensland Government's Nature Conservation Act. As of 21 October 2025, it has not been assessed by the International Union for Conservation of Nature (IUCN).
