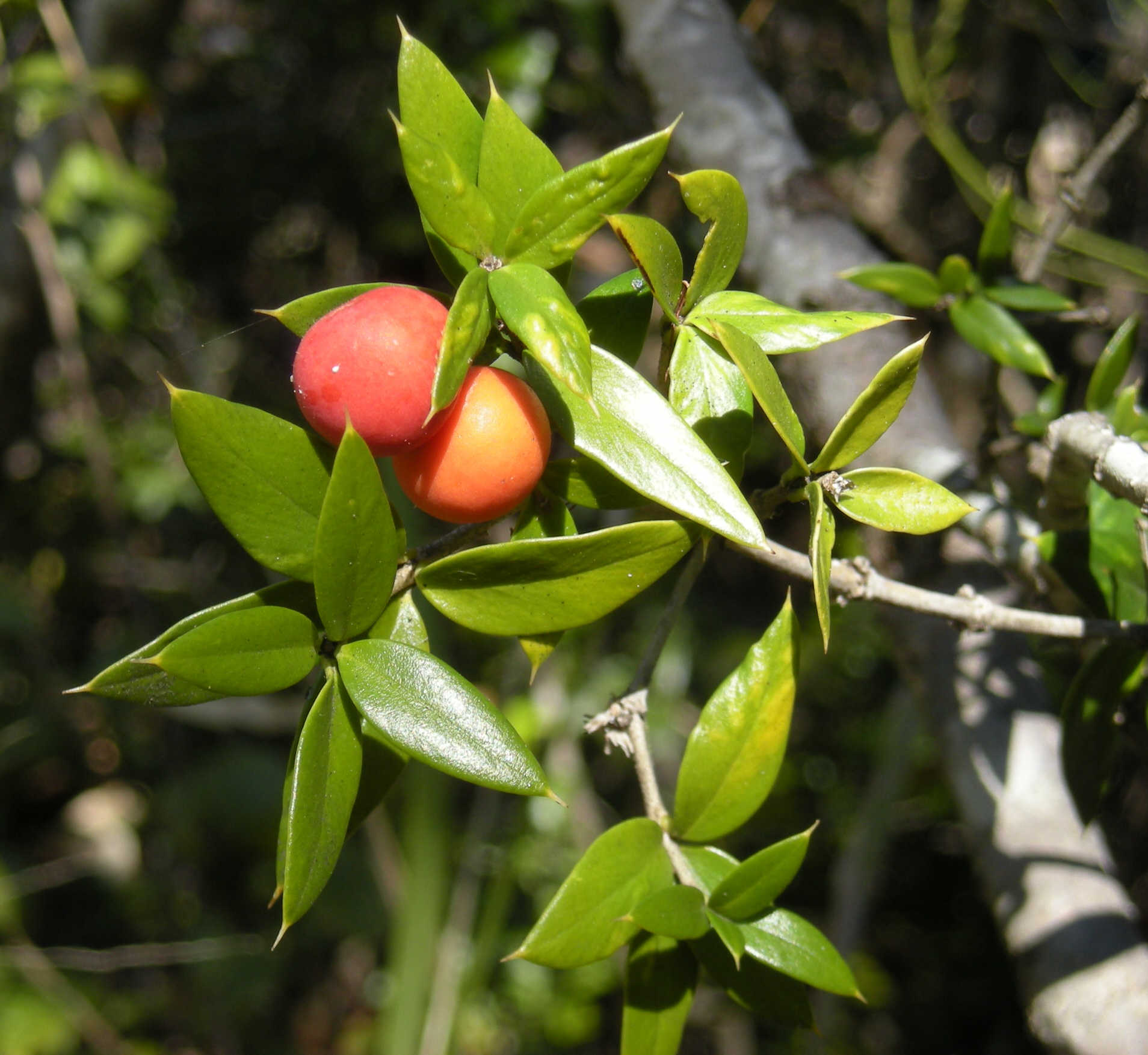
- Alyxia ruscifolia
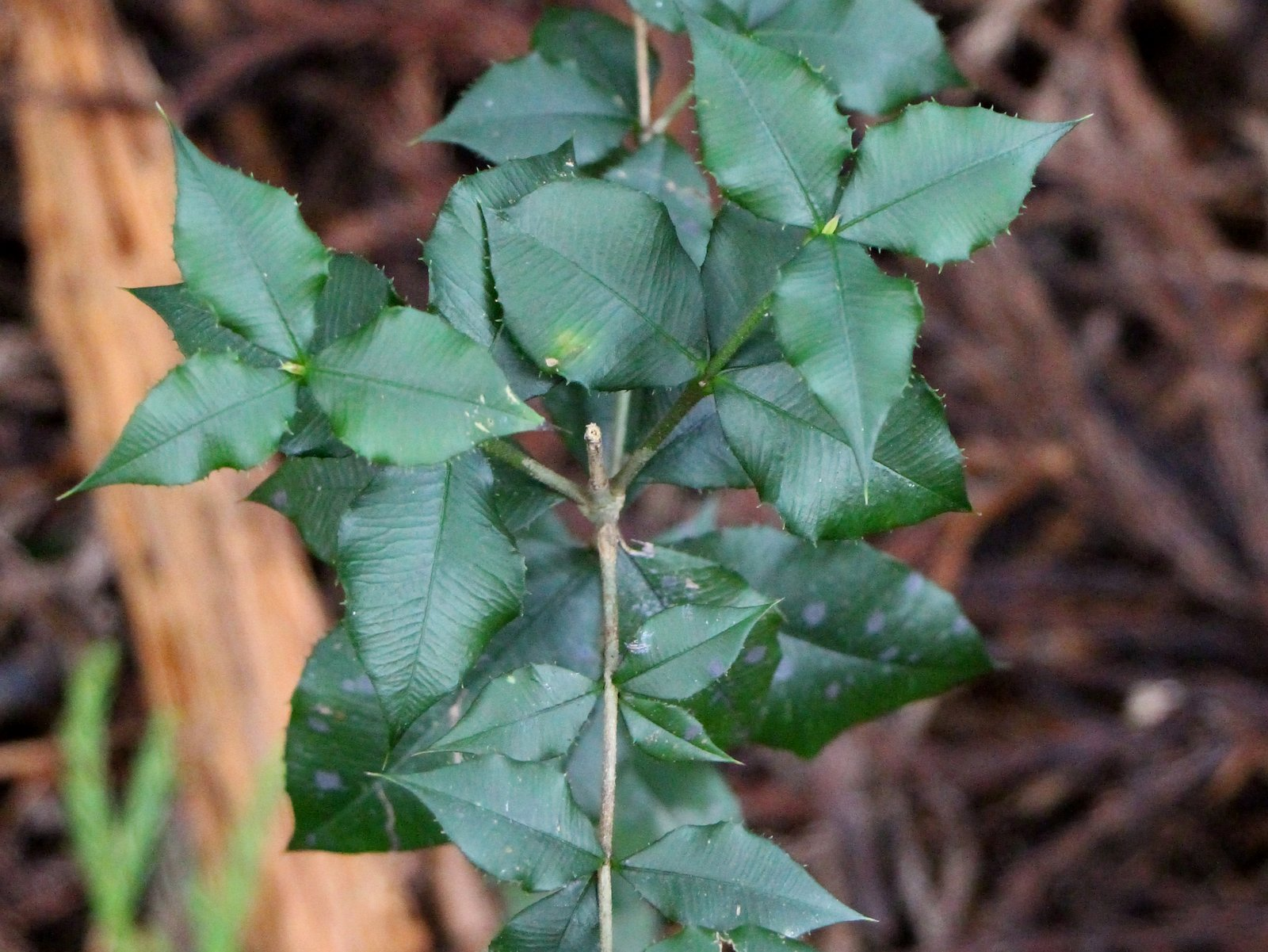
- Form with spiky edged leaves Mount Banda Banda

Scientific classification
- Kingdom: Plantae
- Clade: Tracheophytes
- Clade: Angiosperms
- Clade: Eudicots
- Clade: Asterids
- Order: Gentianales
- Family: Apocynaceae
- Genus: Alyxia
- Species: A. ruscifolia

Binomial name
- Alyxia ruscifolia R.Br.

= Alyxia ruscifolia =

Species of flowering plant

Alyxia ruscifolia, commonly known as the chainfruit or prickly alyxia, is a shrub of high rainfall areas in eastern Australia. The natural range of distribution is from Wollongong in New South Wales to the Wet Tropics and further north to New Guinea.

It can be seen in a variety of different situations. Such as the sub tropical Lord Howe Island, surrounded by the ocean, or the tropical rainforest understorey at Kuranda in Queensland. Or the exposed rocky cliffs on the Mount Royal Range in New South Wales, where it is subject to high winds and snow. The habitat is many types of rainforests from sea level to 1200 metres, sometimes also seen in sclerophyll forests.

== Description ==
Usually around 2 metres tall, sometimes larger. Leaves in whorls, narrow lanceolate to broad lanceolate in shape, 1 to 6 cm long. Thick, leathery and glossy with a pointed tip. Leaves usually not toothed, lateral veins obvious. The leaf stem is between 1 and 4 mm long.

Fragrant white flowers form in spring and summer, in terminal heads of 3 to 5 flowers. The fruit is orange to red in colour, 8 to 11 mm in diameter.
