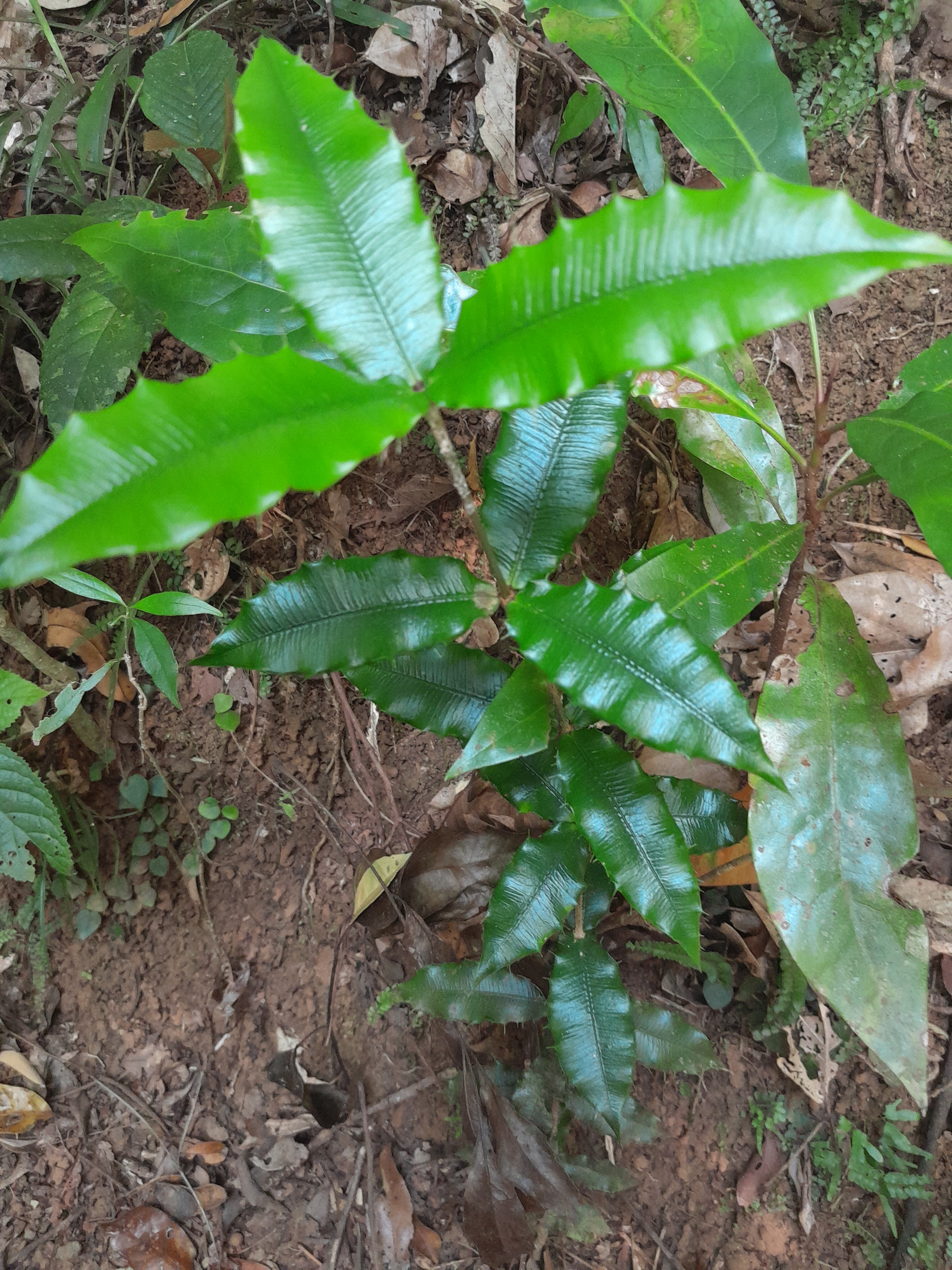
- At Lake Barrine, Queensland

Conservation status
- Least Concern (IUCN 3.1)

Scientific classification
- Kingdom: Plantae
- Clade: Tracheophytes
- Clade: Angiosperms
- Clade: Eudicots
- Clade: Asterids
- Order: Gentianales
- Family: Apocynaceae
- Genus: Alyxia
- Species: A. ilicifolia

Binomial name
- Alyxia ilicifolia F.Muell.

Synonyms
- Gynopogon ilicifolius (F.Muell.) K.Schum.; Pulassarium ilicifolium (F.Muell.) Kuntze

= Alyxia ilicifolia =

Native holly

Species of flowering plant

Alyxia ilicifolia, commonly known as native holly, is a species of plant in the oleander and frangipani family Apocynaceae, found only in the Wet Tropics bioregion of Queensland, Australia. It was first described by German-born Australian botanist Ferdinand von Mueller in 1864.

== Description ==
It is a shrub to about 5 m (16 ft) tall, but often flowering when just 2 m (6 ft 7 in) tall. The leaves are produced in whorls of three or four, ovate in outline, with about 50 lateral veins on either side of the midrib at an angle of almost 90° to it. The leaves may have several short sharp spines about 3 mm (0.12 in) long on the edges.

Inflorescences are branched cymes about 20 mm (0.79 in) long. The flowers are white, corolla tube is about 10 mm (0.39 in) long and the lobes about 3–7 mm (0.12–0.28 in) long. The fruit is orange when ripe and sometimes resembles a string of beads, it may be up to 23 mm (0.9 in) long and 12 mm (0.5 in) wide.

== Distribution and habitat ==
This species is restricted to rainforest on the coastal ranges of northeast Queensland above 600 m (2,000 ft), from about Cooktown south to about Cardwell. It is usually found on soils derived from granite.

== Conservation ==
As of December 2024, this species has been assessed to be of least concern by the International Union for Conservation of Nature (IUCN) and by the Queensland Government under its Nature Conservation Act.

== Gallery ==
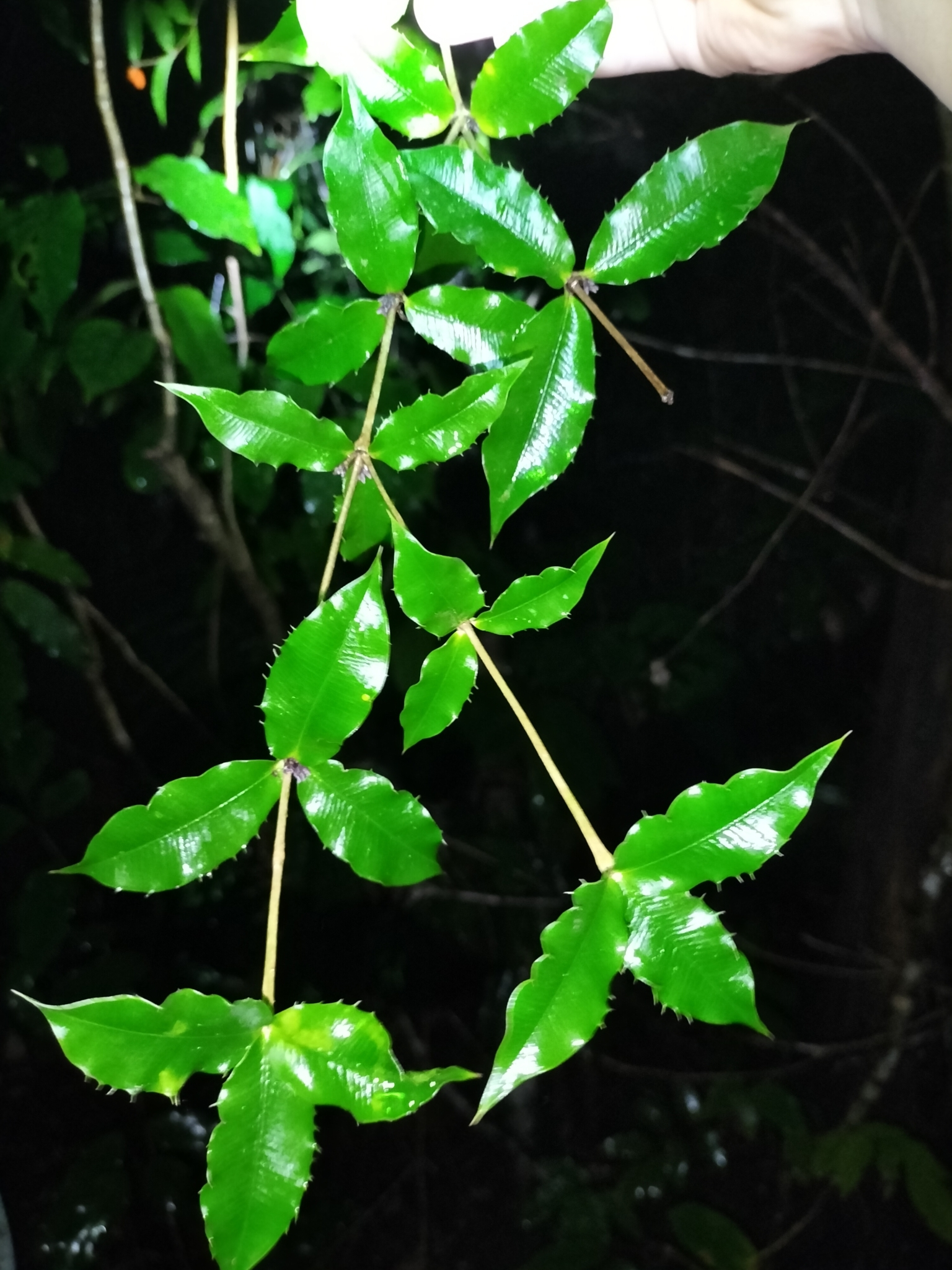
Foliage

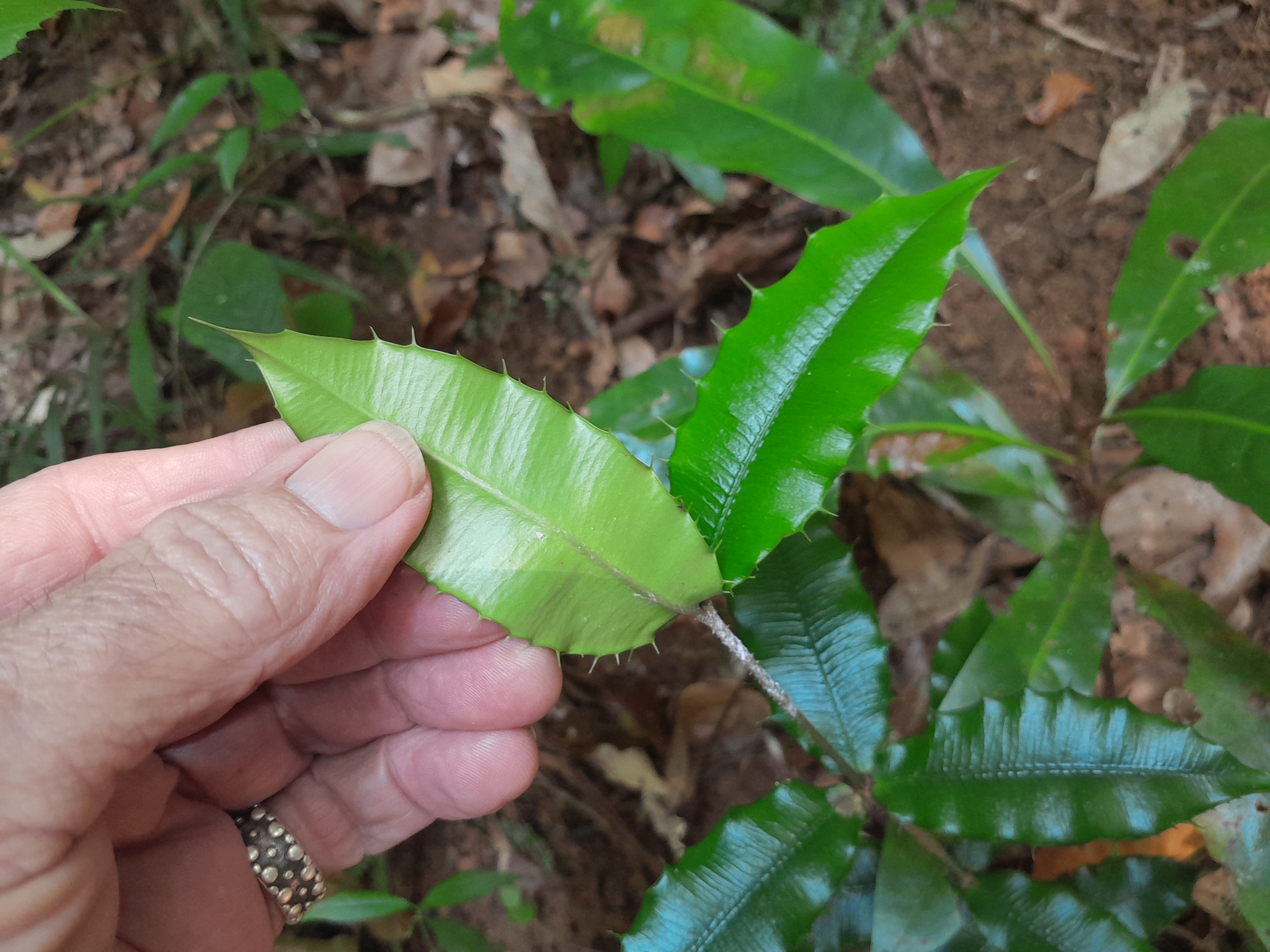
Underside of leaf

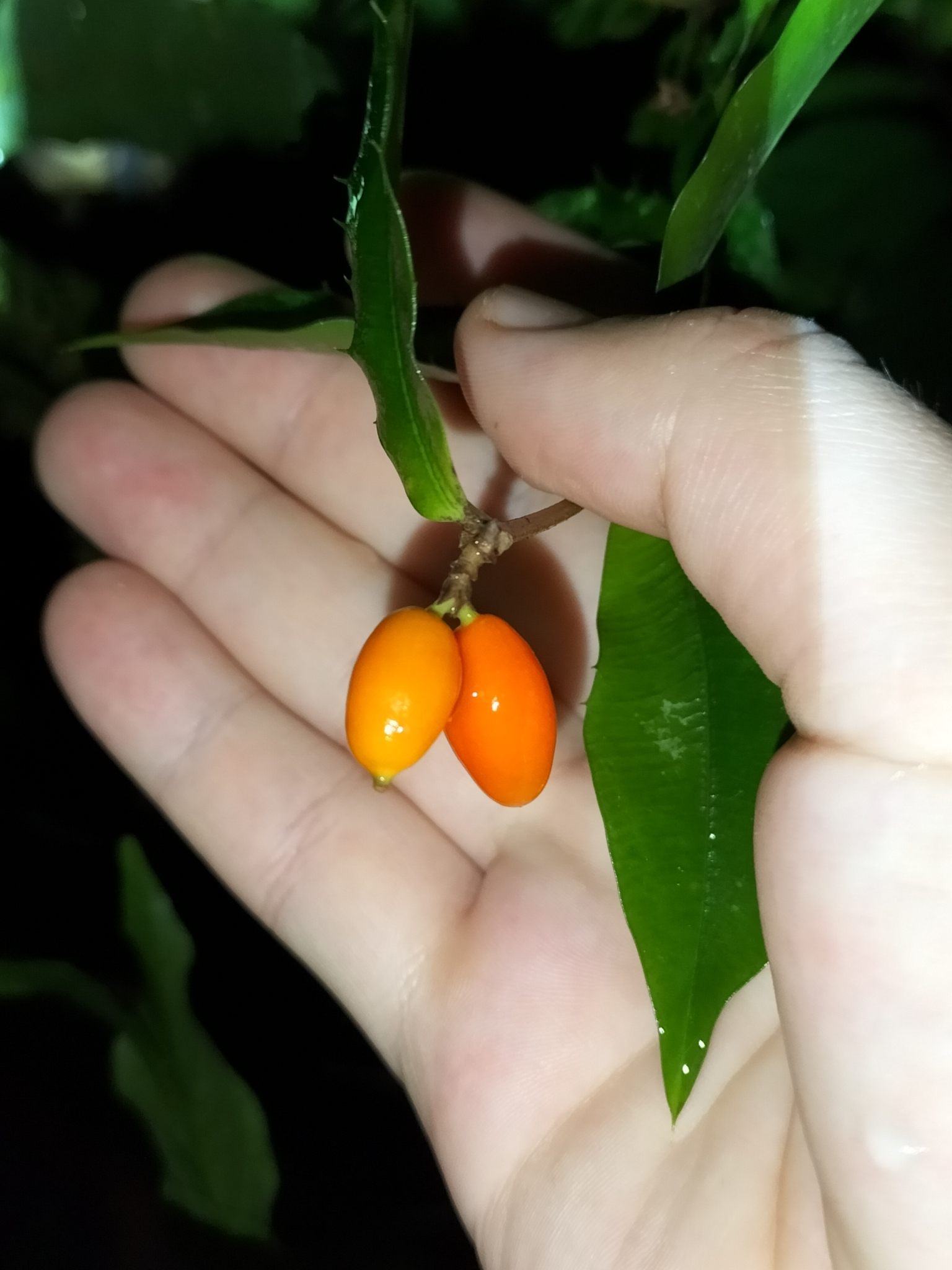
Fruit

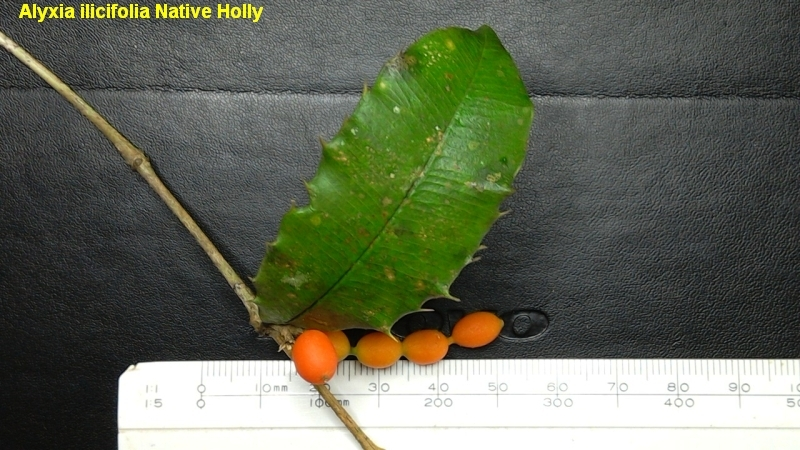
Fruit
