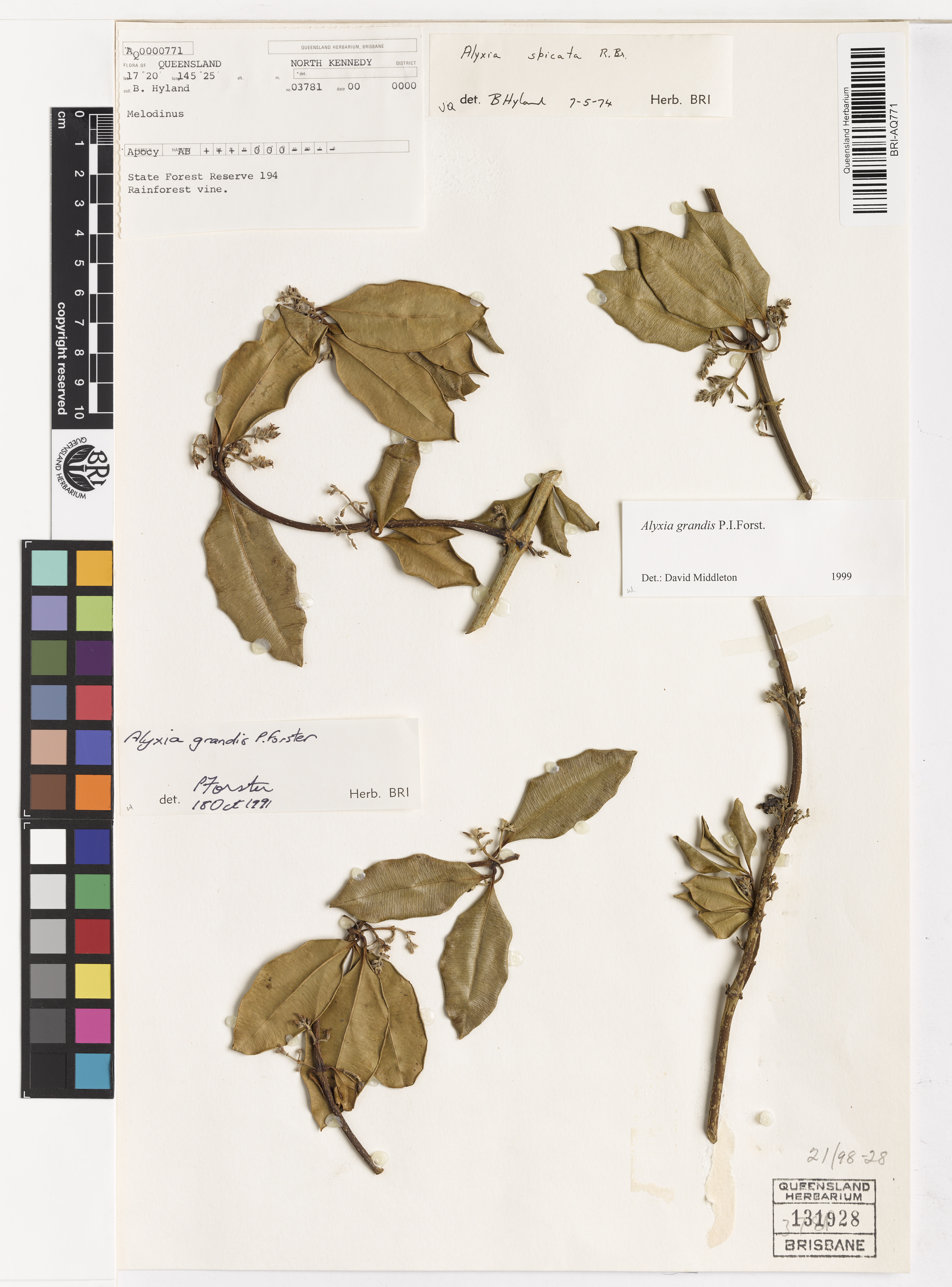
- Herbarium specimen with flowers

Conservation status
- Least Concern (NCA)

Scientific classification
- Kingdom: Plantae
- Clade: Tracheophytes
- Clade: Angiosperms
- Clade: Eudicots
- Clade: Asterids
- Order: Gentianales
- Family: Apocynaceae
- Genus: Alyxia
- Species: A. grandis

Binomial name
- Alyxia grandis P.I.Forst.

= Alyxia grandis =

Species of flowering plant

Alyxia grandis is a species of plant in the oleander and frangipani family Apocynaceae. It is native to the Wet Tropics bioregion of Queensland, Australia.

== Description ==
Alyxia grandis is a twining climber with stems up to 15 m (49 ft) long and 5 cm (2.0 in) thick. The stems are marked by large lenticels, and all parts of the plant exude white sap when damaged. The thin but stiff leaves are arranged in whorls of two or three, green above and paler below, and measure up to 11 cm (4.3 in) long and 4 cm (1.6 in) wide. They have about 40 lateral veins either side of the midrib, the leaf edges are smooth and curl downwards slightly.

The cream-yellow flowers are born on cymes about 20 mm (0.8 in) long, and are about 4 mm (0.16 in) long and wide. The fruit is yellow when ripe, cylindrical, and measures up to 20 mm (0.8 in) long and 13 mm (0.5 in) wide.

== Taxonomy ==
It was first described by Australian botanist Paul Irwin Forster in 1992.

== Distribution and habitat ==
This species grows as a tree-top vine in rainforest, at altitudes from sea level to about 1,300 m (4,300 ft), but is more common at altitude. It occurs from the area near Cooktown to about Girringun National Park.

== Conservation ==
This species is listed as least concern under the Queensland Government's Nature Conservation Act. As of 21 October 2025, it has not been assessed by the International Union for Conservation of Nature (IUCN).
