= Alyxia sinensis =

Conservation status
- Least Concern (IUCN 3.1)

Scientific classification
- Kingdom: Plantae
- Clade: Tracheophytes
- Clade: Angiosperms
- Clade: Eudicots
- Clade: Asterids
- Order: Gentianales
- Family: Apocynaceae
- Genus: Alyxia
- Species: A. sinensis

Binomial name
- Alyxia sinensis Champ. ex Benth.

Species of flowering plant

Alyxia sinensis is a species of flowering plant in the family Apocynaceae, that is native to China, Vietnam and Taiwan. It is threatened by habitat loss. It grows orange berries and eye shaped, leather-like leaves. The leaves grow in whorls of 3-7 opposite to each other on long twirling vines. Seeds begin forming in approximately 1 month, germinating in just over 4 months.
