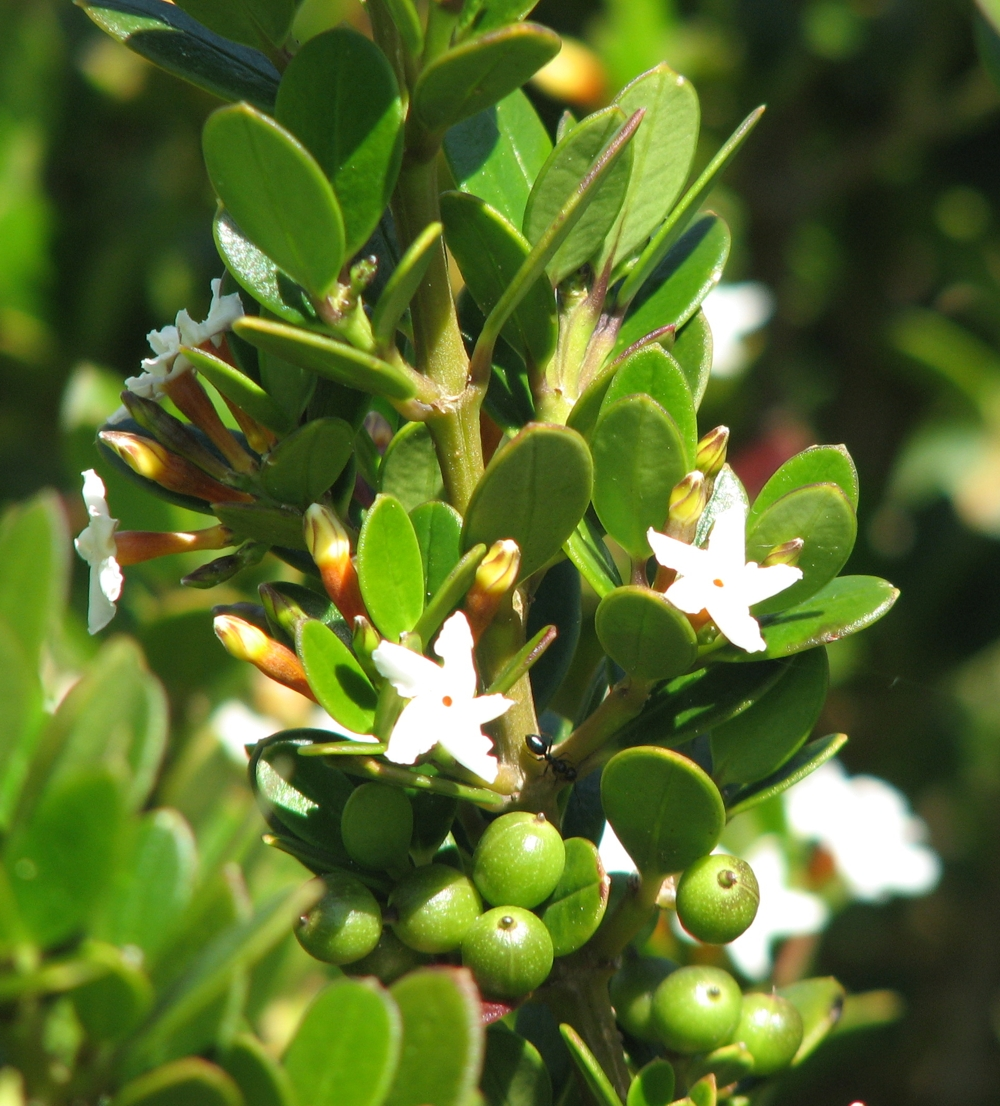
- Alyxia buxifolia

Scientific classification
- Kingdom: Plantae
- Clade: Tracheophytes
- Clade: Angiosperms
- Clade: Eudicots
- Clade: Asterids
- Order: Gentianales
- Family: Apocynaceae
- Subfamily: Rauvolfioideae
- Tribe: Alyxieae
- Subtribe: Alyxiinae
- Genus: Alyxia; R.Br.

Species
- See text

Synonyms
- Alexia Wight; Discalyxia Markgr.; Gynopogon J.R.Forst. & G.Forst.; Paralstonia Baill.; Pulassarium Rumph. ex Kuntze

= Alyxia =

Genus of flowering plants

Alyxia is a genus of flowering plants in the family, Apocynaceae. It contains at present 106 species, but Alyxia stellata and A. tisserantii are very variable, might be cryptic species complexes, and are need of further study. It consists of shrubby, climbing or scrambling plants. This genus occurs in China, the Himalayas, Southeast Asia, Australia, New Caledonia and the Pacific Islands. There are 14 species in Australia, 21 in New Caledonia and 7 in the other Pacific Islands, including Hawaiʻi.

The leaves are opposite or in whorls of three to seven. There are colleters (groups or tufts of mucilaginous secretory hairs) present in the leaf axils. The inflorescence is axillary or terminal with solitary flowers or simple cymes. Flowers consist of five petals and five sepals. The flowers have a slender tube which expands abruptly. The stamens have short filaments and are inserted in the upper half of the corolla. The fruit is a pair of drupes, originating from each flower.

Dysentery bush (A. buxifolia) is used in herbalism and was made into a patented remedy by Albert Aspinall. Maile (A. oliviformis), endemic to the Hawaiian Islands, has sweet-smelling leaves and is much used for lei; formerly it was reserved for aliʻi (nobility), but today it can be used by anyone and is a popular wedding decoration on the islands. Maile also provides food for Thyrocopa caterpillars and weevils of the genus Proterhinus. Alyxia spp. are also used in Jamu.

== Species ==
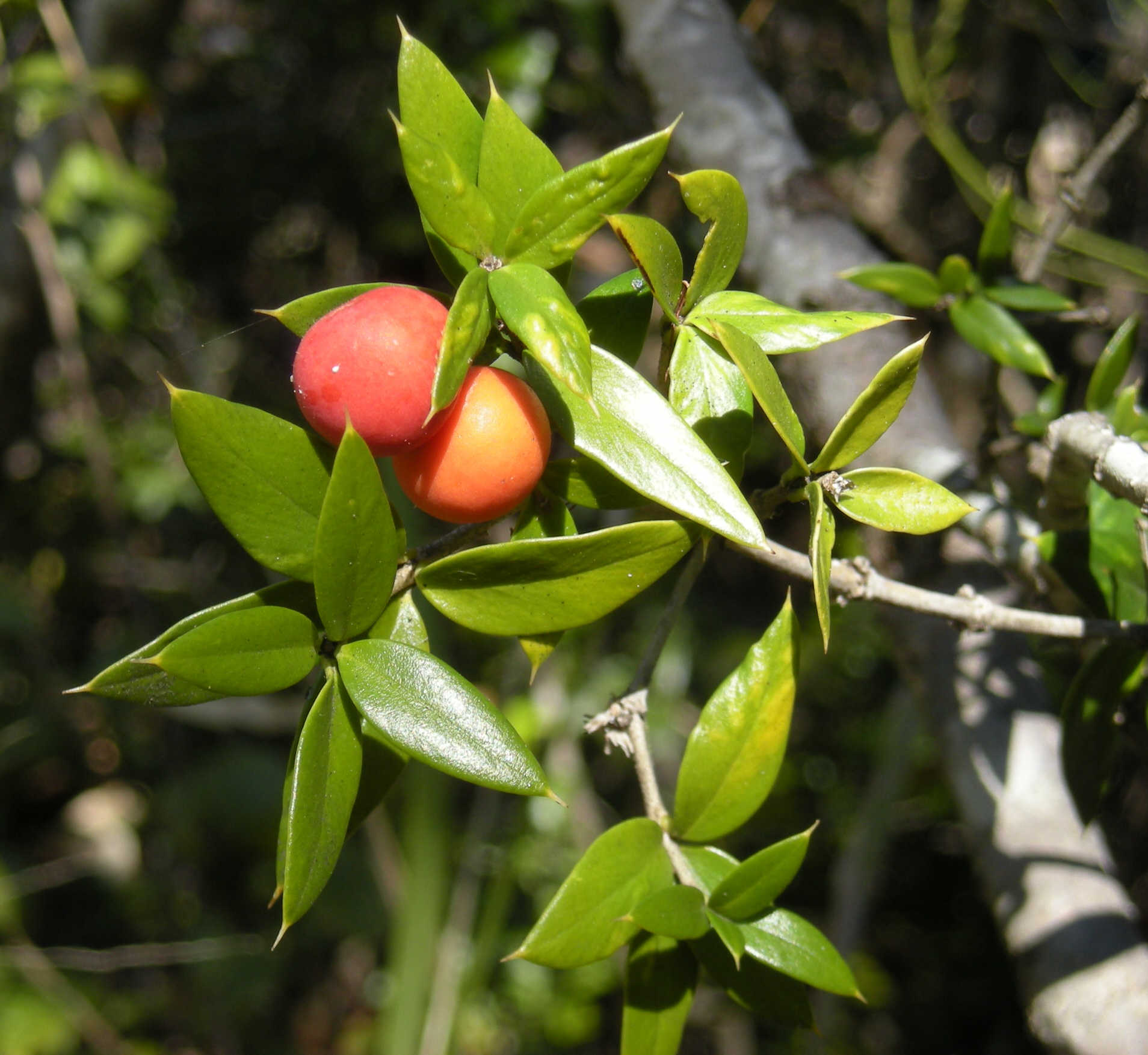
Chain Fruit (Alyxia ruscifolia)

As of March 2026, Plants of the World Online accepts the following 117 species:

- Alyxia acuminata K.Schum.
- Alyxia angustifolia Ridl.
- Alyxia angustissima Merr. & Quisumb.
- Alyxia annamensis Pit.
- Alyxia arfakensis Kaneh. & Hatus.
- Alyxia baillonii Guillaumin
- Alyxia balansae Pit.
- Alyxia bracteolosa Rich. ex A.Gray
- Alyxia buxifolia R.Br.
- Alyxia cacuminum Markgr.
- Alyxia caletioides (Baill.) Guillaumin ex Däniker
- Alyxia celastrinea (Baill.) Schltr. ex Guillaumin
- Alyxia celebica D.J.Middleton
- Alyxia clusiophylla (Baill.) Guillaumin
- Alyxia composita Warb.
- Alyxia concatenata (Blanco) Merr.
- Alyxia cylindrocarpa Guillaumin
- Alyxia defoliata Markgr.
- Alyxia dolioliflora Guillaumin
- Alyxia efatensis Guillaumin
- Alyxia erythrosperma Gillespie
- Alyxia evansii D.J.Middleton
- Alyxia fascicularis (Wall. ex G.Don) Benth. ex Hook.f.
- Alyxia floribunda Markgr.
- Alyxia funingensis Tsiang & P.T.Li
- Alyxia ganophylla Markgr.
- Alyxia glaucophylla Van Heurck & Müll.Arg.
- Alyxia globosa D.J.Middleton
- Alyxia graciliflora D.J.Middleton
- Alyxia gracilis (Wall. ex A.DC.) Benth. ex Hook.f.
- Alyxia grandis P.I.Forst.
- Alyxia gynopogon Roem. & Schult.
- Alyxia hainanensis Merr. & Chun
- Alyxia halmaheirae Miq.
- Alyxia humboldtensis Lannuzel & Gâteblé
- Alyxia hurlimannii Guillaumin
- Alyxia ilicifolia F.Muell.
- Alyxia kaalaensis Boiteau
- Alyxia kabaenae Markgr.
- Alyxia kendarica Markgr.
- Alyxia kwalotabaa D.J.Middleton
- Alyxia lackii D.J.Middleton
- Alyxia lamii Markgr.
- Alyxia laurina Gaudich.
- Alyxia leucogyne Van Heurck & Müll.Arg.
- Alyxia linearis Markgr.
- Alyxia loeseneriana Schltr.
- Alyxia longiloba D.J.Middleton
- Alyxia luzoniensis Merr.
- Alyxia magnifolia F.M.Bailey
- Alyxia manusiana D.J.Middleton
- Alyxia margaretae Boiteau
- Alyxia marginata Pit.
- Alyxia markgrafii Tsiang
- Alyxia menglungensis Tsiang & P.T.Li
- Alyxia microphylla Markgr.
- Alyxia minimiflora Lannuzel
- Alyxia minutiflora D.J.Middleton
- Alyxia monticola C.B.Rob.
- Alyxia mucronata D.J.Middleton
- Alyxia muguma D.J.Middleton
- Alyxia mujongensis Markgr.
- Alyxia multistriata Markgr.
- Alyxia nathoi Lý
- Alyxia nummularia S.Moore
- Alyxia oblongata Domin
- Alyxia obovatifolia Merr.
- Alyxia oleifolia King & Gamble
- Alyxia oppositifolia Boiteau
- Alyxia orophila Domin
- Alyxia oubatchensis (Schltr.) Guill. ex Boiteau
- Alyxia palawanensis Markgr.
- Alyxia paniensis Lannuzel
- Alyxia papuana D.J.Middleton
- Alyxia parvifolia (Merr.) Merr.
- Alyxia pilosa Miq.
- Alyxia podocarpa Van Heurck & Müll.Arg.
- Alyxia poyaensis (Boiteau) D.J.Middleton
- Alyxia pseudoserpentina Boiteau
- Alyxia pseudosinensis Pit.
- Alyxia pugio Markgr.
- Alyxia pullei Markgr.
- Alyxia punctata Kaneh. & Hatus.
- Alyxia purpureoclada Kaneh. & Hatus.
- Alyxia racemosa Pit.
- Alyxia reinwardtii Blume
- Alyxia ridleyana Wernham
- Alyxia rosmarinifolia (Baill.) Guillaumin
- Alyxia rostrata (Markgr.) Markgr.
- Alyxia royeniana Markgr.
- Alyxia rubricaulis (Baill.) Guillaumin
- Alyxia ruscifolia R.Br.
- Alyxia samoensis (Christoph.) A.C.Sm.
- Alyxia sarasinii Guillaumin
- Alyxia scabrida Markgr.
- Alyxia schlechteri H.Lév.
- Alyxia semipallescens F.Muell.
- Alyxia sharpei P.I.Forst.
- Alyxia siamensis Craib
- Alyxia sinensis Champ. ex Benth.
- Alyxia sleumeri Markgr.
- Alyxia sogerensis Wernham ex S.Moore
- Alyxia solomonensis D.J.Middleton
- Alyxia spicata R.Br.
- Alyxia squamulosa C.Moore & F.Muell.
- Alyxia stellata (J.R.Forst. & G.Forst.) Roem. & Schult.
- Alyxia sulana Markgr.
- Alyxia tetanifolia Cranfield
- Alyxia tetraquetra Markgr.
- Alyxia thailandica D.J.Middleton
- Alyxia tisserantii Montrouz.
- Alyxia torquata (Baill.) Guillaumin
- Alyxia tropica (P.I.Forst.) D.J.Middleton
- Alyxia uniflora D.J.Middleton
- Alyxia urceolata Lannuzel
- Alyxia veillonii D.J.Middleton
- Alyxia vera D.J.Middleton
