= Alyxia menglungensis =

Conservation status
- Endangered (IUCN 3.1)

Scientific classification
- Kingdom: Plantae
- Clade: Tracheophytes
- Clade: Angiosperms
- Clade: Eudicots
- Clade: Asterids
- Order: Gentianales
- Family: Apocynaceae
- Genus: Alyxia
- Species: A. menglungensis

Binomial name
- Alyxia menglungensis Tsiang & P.T.Li

Species of plant

Alyxia menglungensis is a species of flowering plant in the family Apocynaceae. It is a climber endemic to southern Yunnan in south-central China.
