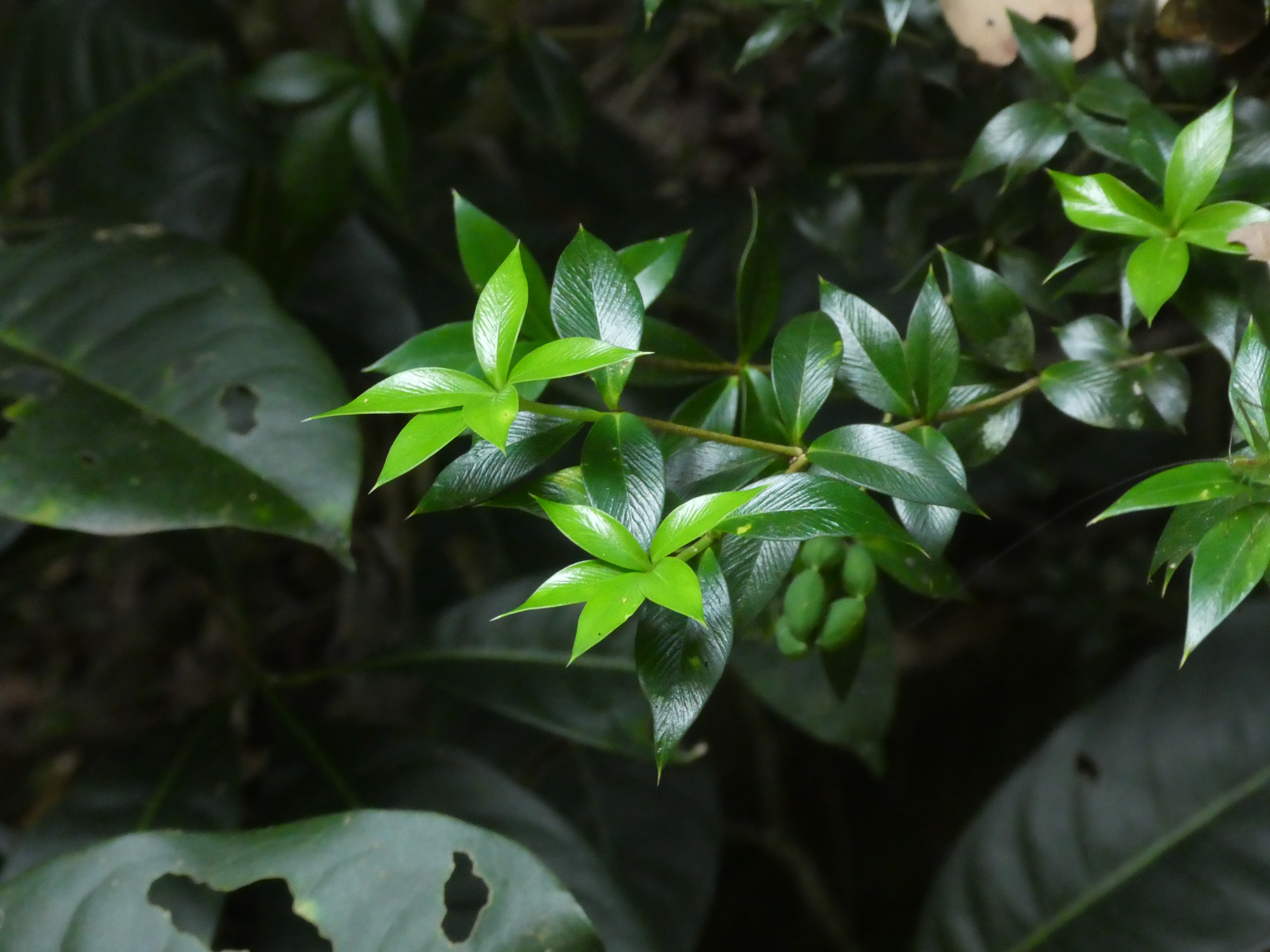

Conservation status
- Least Concern (NCA)

Scientific classification
- Kingdom: Plantae
- Clade: Tracheophytes
- Clade: Angiosperms
- Clade: Eudicots
- Clade: Asterids
- Order: Gentianales
- Family: Apocynaceae
- Genus: Alyxia
- Species: A. oblongata

Binomial name
- Alyxia oblongata Domin

Synonyms
- Alyxia ruscifolia subsp. major P.I.Forst.

= Alyxia oblongata =

Chain fruit

Species of flowering plant

Alyxia oblongata, commonly known as the chain fruit, prickly lixy, or prickly Alyxia, is a plant in the dogbane family Apocynaceae endemic to a small part of northeastern Queensland.

== Description ==
Alyxia oblongata is an evergreen shrub growing up to 3 m (9.8 ft) high. The dark glossy green leaves are borne in whorls of three or four on the twigs, and measure about 3.5 by 1 cm (1.38 by 0.39 in). They are elliptic with a sharp, rigid tip and have up to 20 lateral veins.

The flowers are typical of the family, being white with five sepals and petals and a long corolla tube. They measure about 13 mm (0.51 in) long and 17 mm (0.67 in) diameter. The fruit are orange/red in colour and may be moniliform, i.e. with the appearance of a string of beads.

== Taxonomy ==
This species was first described in 1928 by Czech botanist Karel Domin, who published his description in Bibliotheca Botanica. In 1992 Australian botanist Paul Irwin Forster redefined it as a subspecies of Alyxia ruscifolia, namely A.r. ssp. major, however this combination is no longer accepted by most authorities.

=== Etymology ===
The genus name Alyxia is derived from the Greek word álysos, 'chain', which refers to the chain-like appearance of the fruit. The species epithet oblongata is from 'oblong' and again refers to the appearance of the fruit.

== Distribution and habitat ==
The chain fruit is endemic to northeastern Queensland, from near Cooktown to the southern Atherton Tablelands. It grows in rainforest on volcanic soils of various types, at altitudes from 100 m (330 ft) to 1,000 m (3,300 ft).

== Conservation ==
This species is listed by the Queensland Department of Environment and Science as least concern. As of 28 January 2023, it has not been assessed by the IUCN.

== Gallery ==
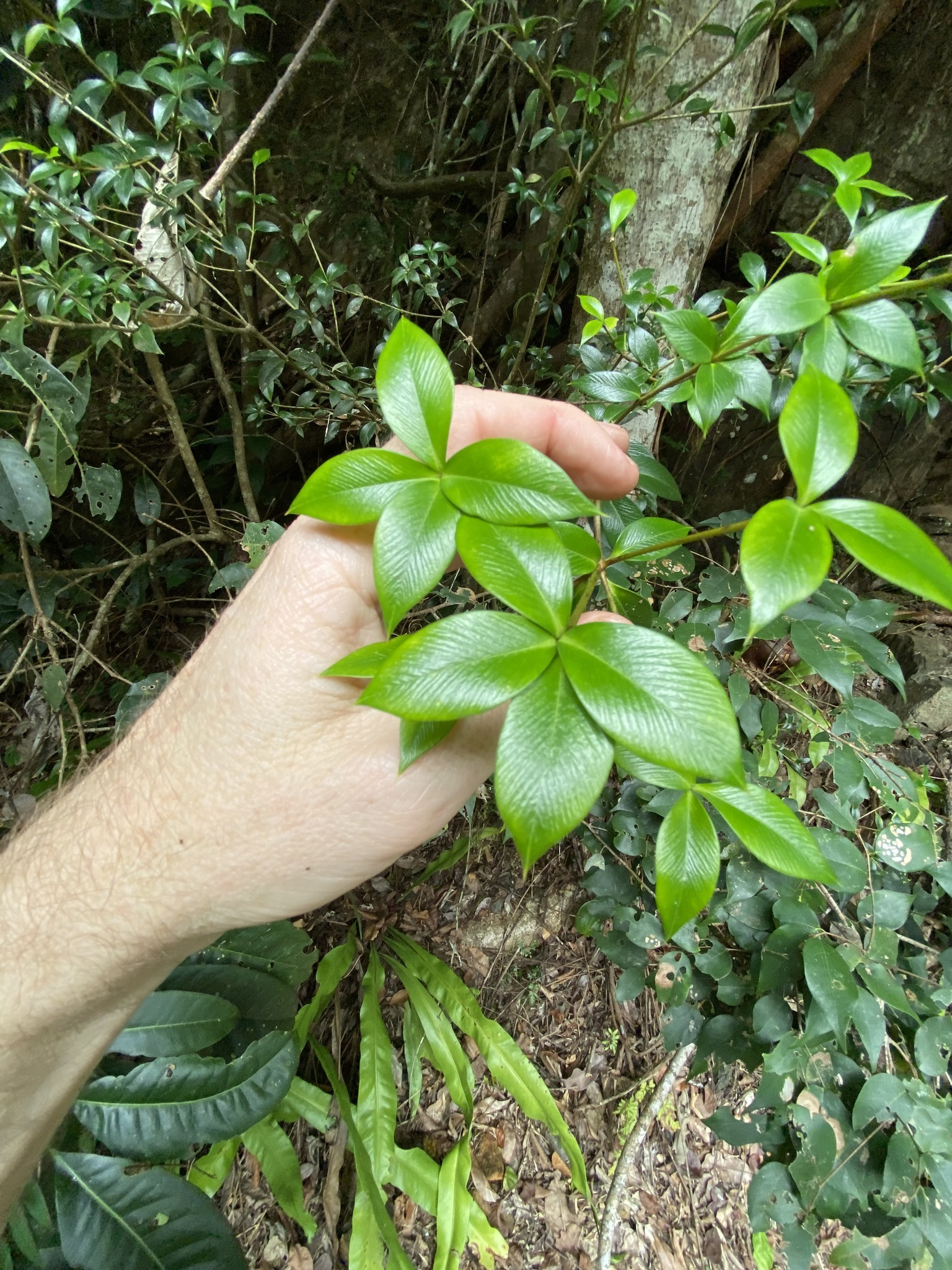
Foliage

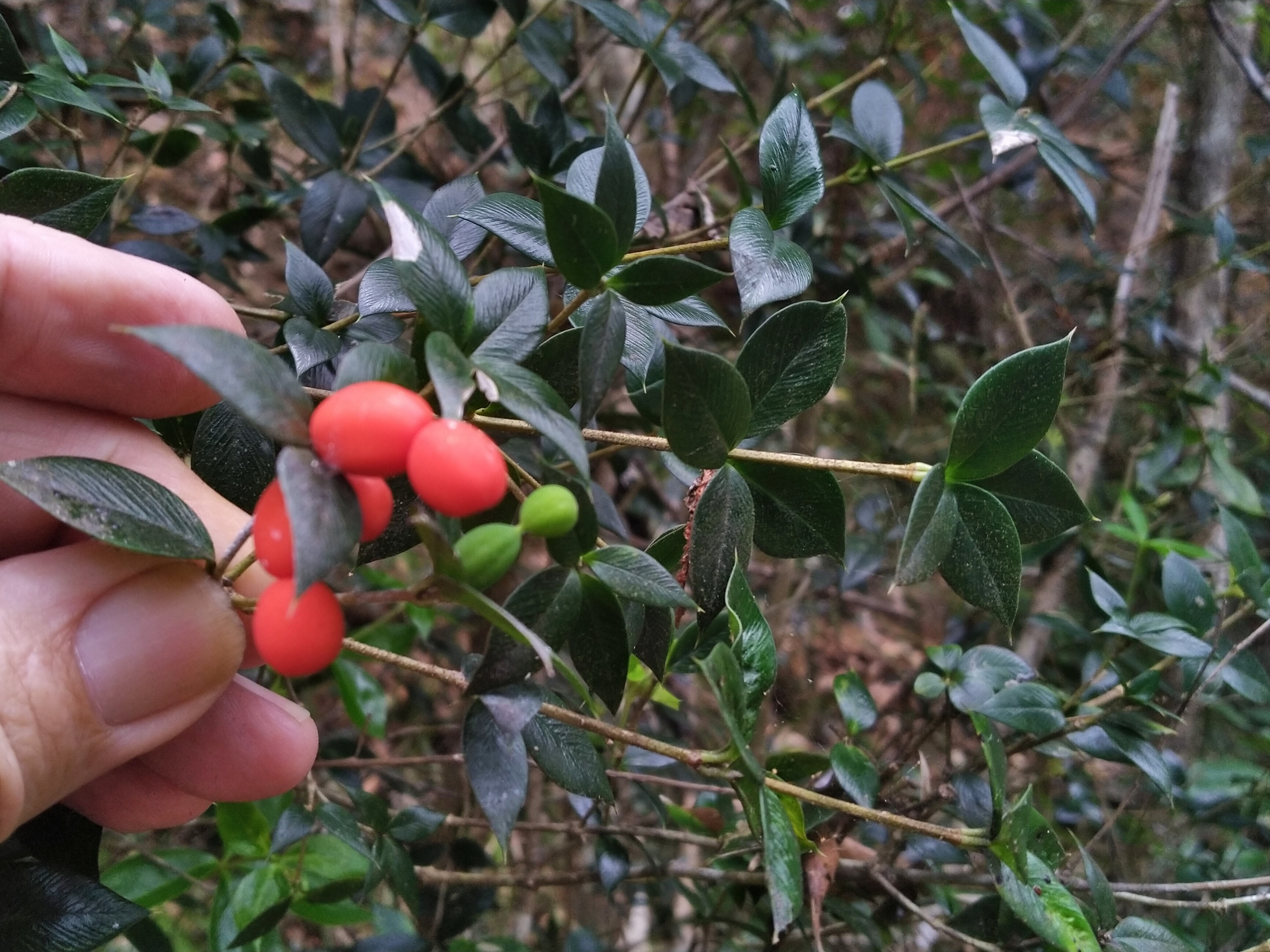
Ripening fruit

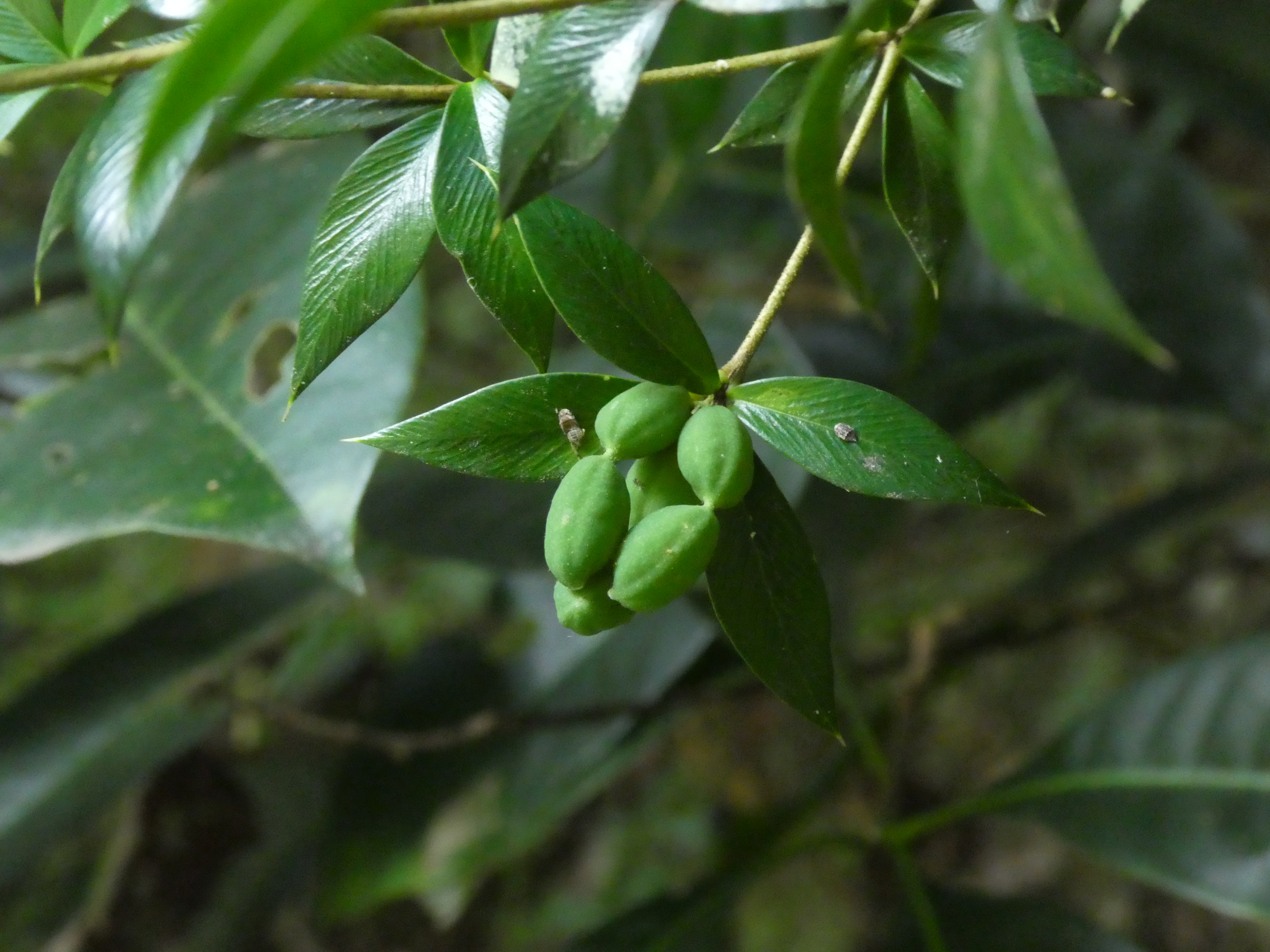
Unripe fruit

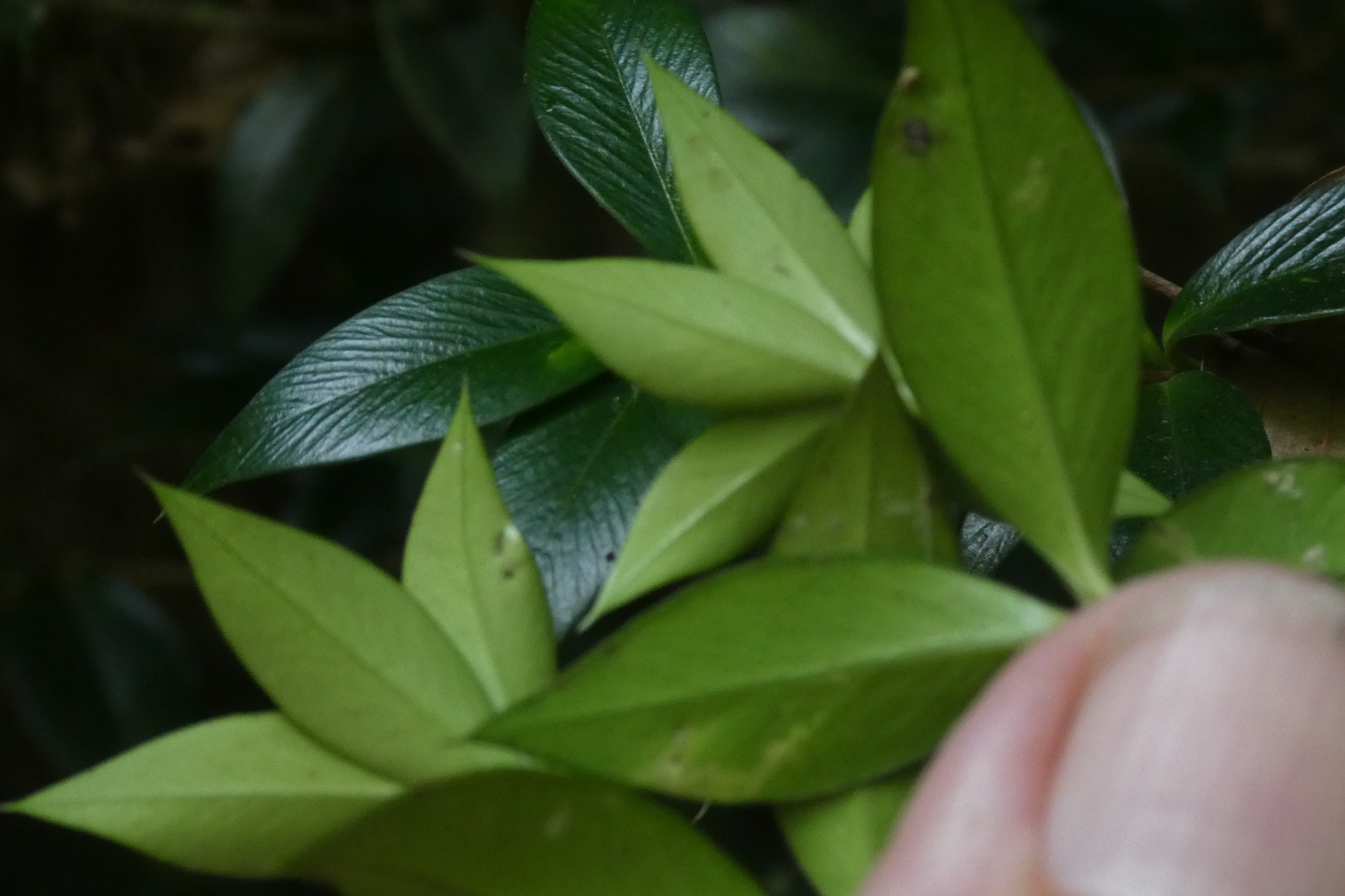
Foliage
