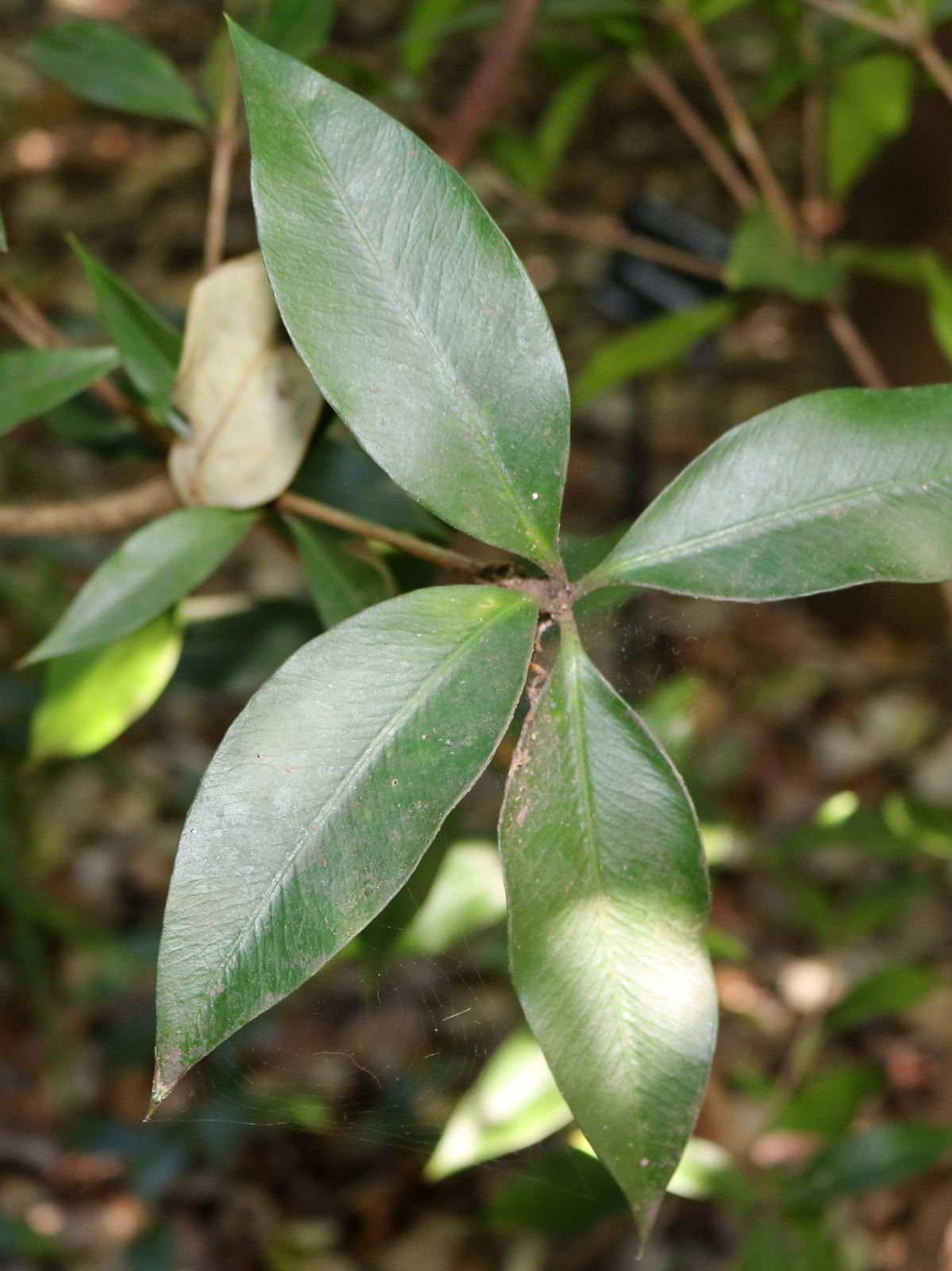

Scientific classification
- Kingdom: Plantae
- Clade: Embryophytes
- Clade: Tracheophytes
- Clade: Spermatophytes
- Clade: Angiosperms
- Clade: Eudicots
- Clade: Asterids
- Order: Gentianales
- Family: Apocynaceae
- Genus: Alyxia
- Species: A. magnifolia

Binomial name
- Alyxia magnifolia F.M.Bailey

= Alyxia magnifolia =

Species of plant

Alyxia magnifolia is a species of flowering plant in the dogbane family Apocynaceae, endemic to Queensland in Australia. Growing to four metres tall in rainforest.
