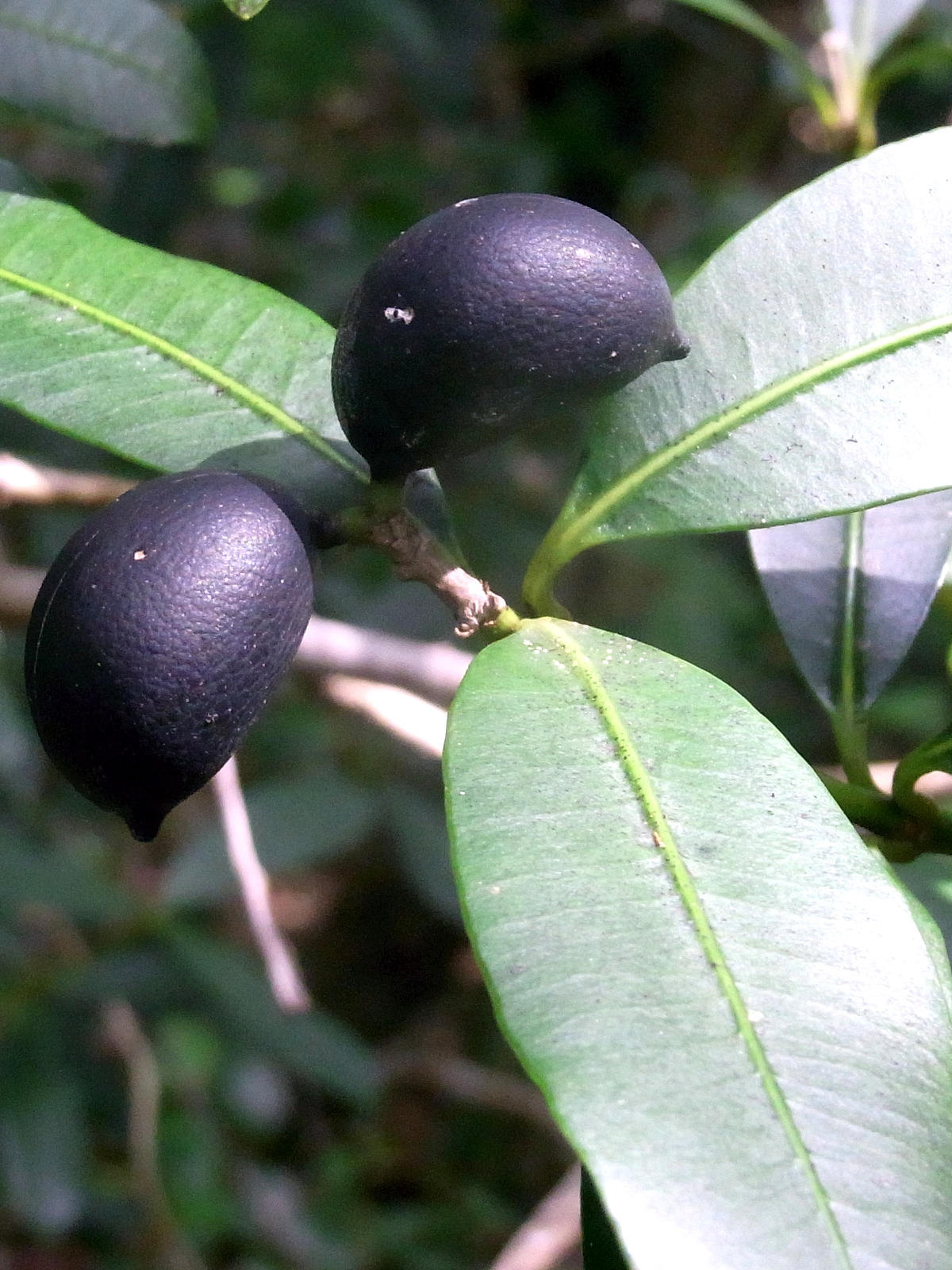

Scientific classification
- Kingdom: Plantae
- Clade: Tracheophytes
- Clade: Angiosperms
- Clade: Eudicots
- Clade: Asterids
- Order: Gentianales
- Family: Apocynaceae
- Genus: Alyxia
- Species: A. squamulosa

Binomial name
- Alyxia squamulosa C.Moore & F.Muell.

Synonyms
- Alyxia lindii F.Muell.

= Alyxia squamulosa =

Species of flowering plant

Alyxia squamulosa, commonly known as alyxia vine, is a species of shrub in the family Apocynaceae. It is endemic to Australia’s subtropical Lord Howe Island in the Tasman Sea. The specific epithet derives from the many bracteoles, or ‘scales’ (Latin: squamae, with the diminutive suffix -ulus) that subtend the flowers. The plant previously known as Alyxia lindii is considered a taxonomic synonym of A. squamulosa, being reassigned in 2002.

== Description ==
The plant has a tendency to climb. Its leaves grow in whorls of five and are 2–5 cm long, 1.5–2.5 cm wide. The fetid white flowers are about 7 mm long, clustered in dense, rounded, terminal inflorescences 2–4 cm in diameter. The fruits are drupaceous, blue-black and about 2 cm long.

== Distribution and habitat ==
The plant is found only on Lord Howe Island, on the lower hills of the island, as well as the higher southern peaks.
