= Alyxia bracteolosa =

Scientific classification
- Kingdom: Plantae
- Clade: Tracheophytes
- Clade: Angiosperms
- Clade: Eudicots
- Clade: Asterids
- Order: Gentianales
- Family: Apocynaceae
- Genus: Alyxia
- Species: A. bracteolosa

Binomial name
- Alyxia bracteolosa Rich. ex A.Gray

Species of plant

Alyxia bracteolosa is a species of flowering plant in the family Apocynaceae, native to the Solomon Islands and south-western Pacific (Fiji, Samoa, Tonga, Vanuatu and Wallis and Futuna). It was first described by Louis Claude Richard in 1862.
