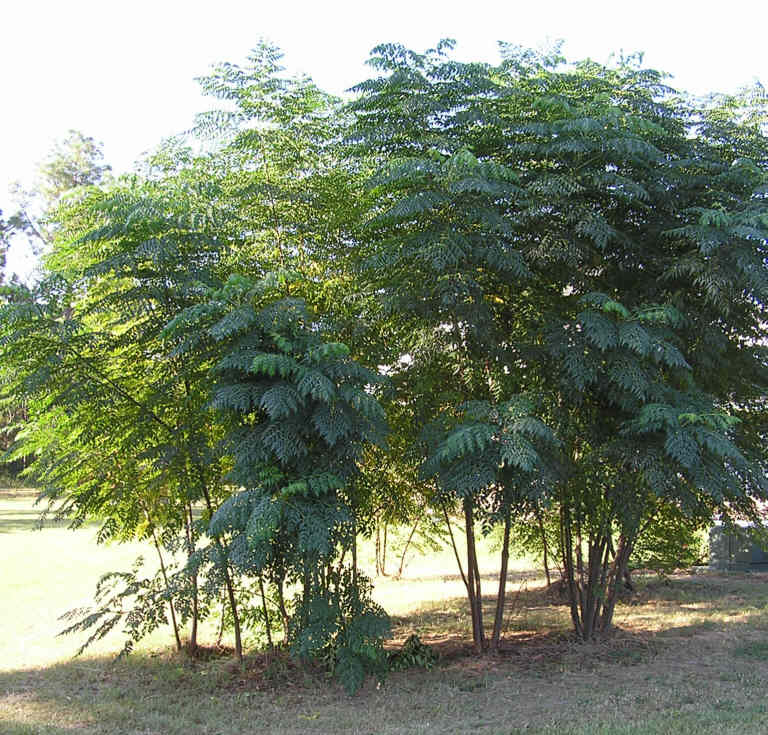
- Clump of Aralia spinosa Nesmith, South Carolina

Scientific classification
- Kingdom: Plantae
- Clade: Embryophytes
- Clade: Tracheophytes
- Clade: Angiosperms
- Clade: Eudicots
- Clade: Asterids
- Order: Apiales
- Family: Araliaceae
- Subfamily: Aralioideae

= Aralioideae =

Subfamily of flowering plants

Aralioideae is a subfamily of flowering plants contains around 50 recognized genera. These include the genus Panax, to which ginseng belongs. Other notable species are the Angelica-tree (devil's walking-stick, Aralia spinosa), the devil's club (Oplopanax horridus), or common ivy (Hedera helix).

Molecular evidence suggests that the Aralioideae diverged from their sister lineage, the relatively species-poor Hydrocotyloideae, during the Middle Eocene.

The Aralioideae consists of five major groups. Of these, strong evidence indicates that the three largest groups, the Asian Palmate group, the Aralia–Panax group, and the Greater Raukaua group, are monophyletic, while the other two, the Polycias–Pseudopanax group and the Osmoxylon group, require additional sampling in molecular phylogenies to demonstrate monophyly. Some genera in the subfamily may be paraphyletic (e.g. Aralia, Raukaua).

The subfamily contains the following genera:

- Apiopetalum
- Mackinlaya
- Pseudosciadium
- Aralia
- Arthrophyllum
- Cuphocarpus
- Gastonia
- Meryta
- Munroidendron
- Panax
- Pentapanax
- Polyscias
- Pseudopanax
- Reynoldsia
- Sciadodendron
- Tetraplasandra
- Astropanax
- Brassaiopsis
- Crepinella
- Dendropanax
- Didymopanax
- Eleutherococcus
- × Fatshedera
- Fatsia
- Frodinia
- Gamblea
- Hedera
- Heptapleurum
- Heteropanax
- Kalopanax
- Macropanax
- Metapanax
- Oplopanax
- Oreopanax
- Schefflera
- Sciodaphyllum
- Sinopanax
- Tetrapanax
- Trevesia
- Tupidanthus
- Anakasia
- Astrotricha
- Cephalaralia
- Cheirodendron
- Cussonia
- Harmsiopanax
- Megalopanax
- Merrilliopanax
- Motherwellia
- Osmoxylon
- Raukaua
- Seemannaralia
- Woodburnia
