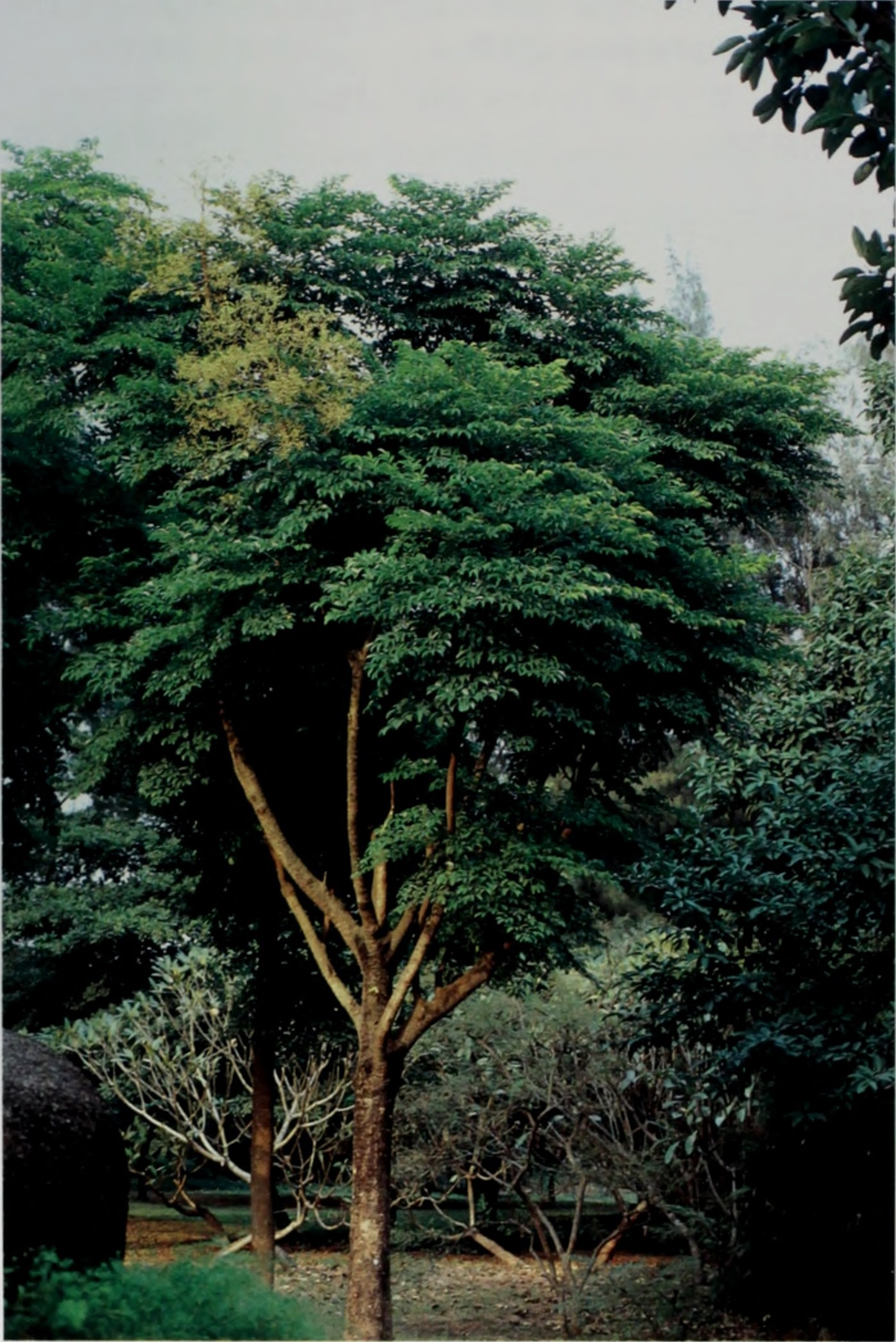

Scientific classification
- Kingdom: Plantae
- Clade: Tracheophytes
- Clade: Angiosperms
- Clade: Eudicots
- Clade: Asterids
- Order: Apiales
- Family: Araliaceae
- Genus: Heteropanax
- Species: H. fragrans

Binomial name
- Heteropanax fragrans (Roxb.) Seem.

Synonyms
- Aralia fragrans (Roxb.) G.Don; Heteropanax fragrans var. attenuatus C.B.Clarke; Heteropanax fragrans var. ferrugineus Y.F.Deng; Heteropanax fragrans var. serrata Haines; Panax fragrans Roxb.

= Heteropanax fragrans =

Species of plant

Heteropanax fragrans is an evergreen plant in the Araliaceae family. The leaves of this arboreal plant are fed on by the larvae of the Eri silk moth (Samia ricini). In the Mizo language it is known as Changkhen and in Assamese it is called Keseru. The tree is found in Assam; Bangladesh; Cambodia; South Central China; China Southeast; Eastern Himalayas; Hainan; India; Myanmar; Nepal; Vietnam; Western Himalayas; Thailand.
