= Harmsiopanax ingens =

Scientific classification
- Kingdom: Plantae
- Clade: Tracheophytes
- Clade: Angiosperms
- Clade: Eudicots
- Clade: Asterids
- Order: Apiales
- Family: Araliaceae
- Genus: Harmsiopanax
- Species: H. ingens

Binomial name
- Harmsiopanax ingens Philipson

Species of flowering plant

Harmsiopanax ingens is a very spiny palmlike mesocaul tree in the family (Araliaceae), endemic to the montane rainforests of central New Guinea which bears a terminal rosette of deeply lobed, dentate margined, usually (but not invariably) peltate leaves 1 m (3 ft 3 in) across, maple-like in shape, on equally long petioles. It ultimately attains a height of 18 m (59 ft), at which point it bears a huge panicle of flowers 5 m (16 ft) high and equally wide; the largest above ground inflorescence of any dicot plant (although Caloncoba flagelliflora of West Africa, Ficus geocarpa of the Malay Peninsula, and Ficus uncinata var. strigosa also of Malaya have larger subsurface panicles, each about 9 m (30 ft) in length). The panicles of H. ingens are unusual; the ultimate twigs being spikes each bearing about fifty tiny umbels, each umbel with 8 to 20 minute flowers; thus panicle, spike and umbel are all represented in a single inflorescence. Harmsiopanax ingens is monocarpic, and again the largest such plant among dicots. It was discovered in 1973 by W. R. Philipson. Its native name is makua.
