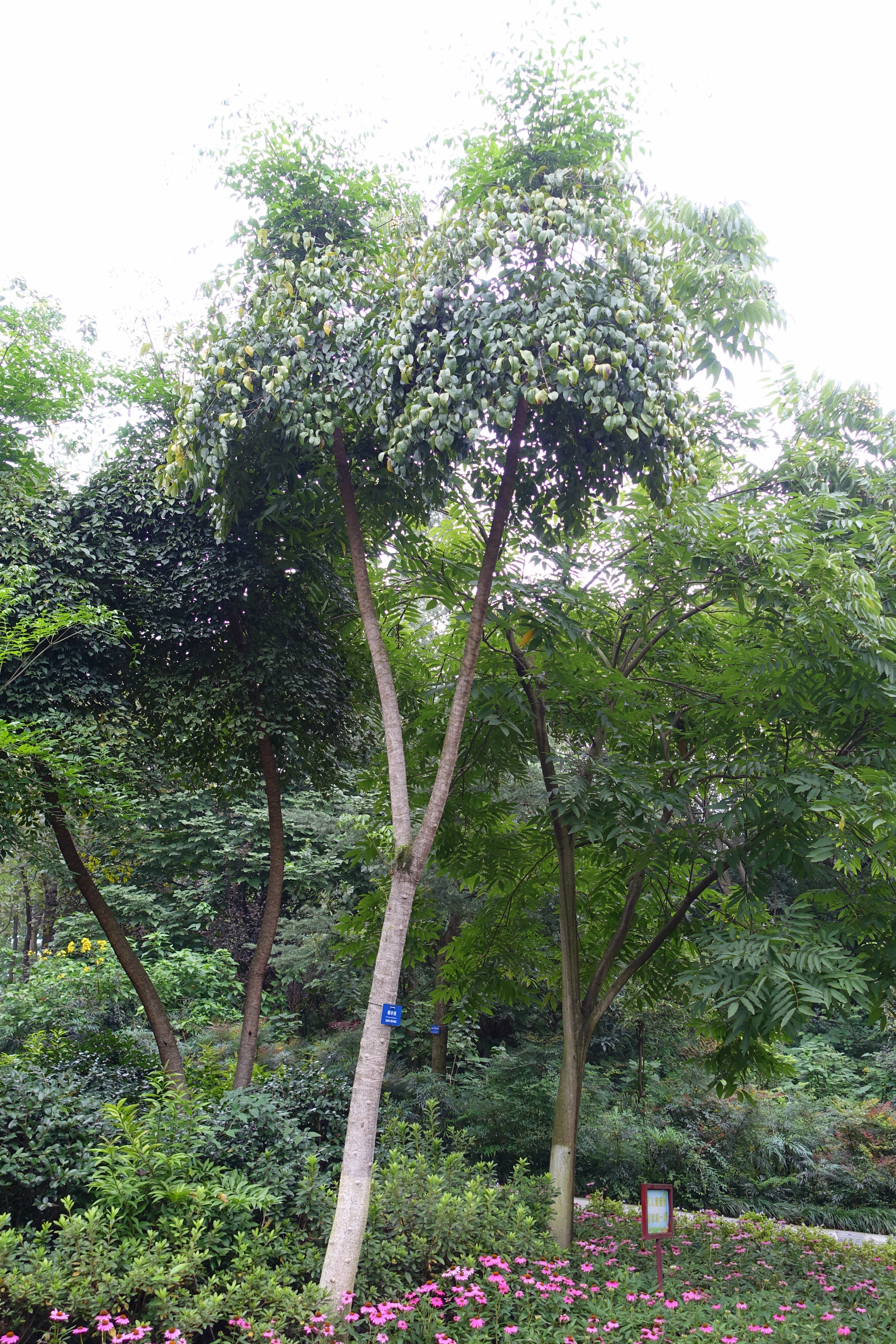
- Heteropanax fragrans

Scientific classification
- Kingdom: Plantae
- Clade: Tracheophytes
- Clade: Angiosperms
- Clade: Eudicots
- Clade: Asterids
- Order: Apiales
- Family: Araliaceae
- Subfamily: Aralioideae
- Genus: Heteropanax; Seem.

Species
- See text

= Heteropanax =

Genus of flowering plants

Heteropanax is a genus of flowering plants in the family Araliaceae. They are native to Asia.

These plants are evergreen shrubs or trees. They are andromonoecious, producing bisexual and male flowers. They have compound leaves made up of a few leaflets. The inflorescence is a panicle of umbels, an array of several clusters of bisexual flowers with a few clusters of male flowers along the sides. Each has five petals. The fruit is a flattened drupe.

There are about ten species. Two are endemic to China.

Species include:

- Heteropanax balanseanus
- Heteropanax brevipedicellatus
- Heteropanax chinensis
  - H. chinensis var. chinensis
  - H. chinensis var. longipedicellata
- Heteropanax dhruvii
- Heteropanax fragrans
  - H. fragrans var. attenuatus
  - H. fragrans var. subcordatus
- Heteropanax hainanensis
- Heteropanax nitentifolius
- Heteropanax phanrangensis
- Heteropanax yunnanensis
