= Brassaiopsis glomerulata =

Conservation status
- Least Concern (IUCN 3.1)

Scientific classification
- Kingdom: Plantae
- Clade: Tracheophytes
- Clade: Angiosperms
- Clade: Eudicots
- Clade: Asterids
- Order: Apiales
- Family: Araliaceae
- Genus: Brassaiopsis
- Species: B. glomerulata

Binomial name
- Brassaiopsis glomerulata (Blume) Regel

Species of tree

Brassaiopsis glomerulata is a species of shrub in the family Araliaceae. Extracts are sold as bodybuilding supplements based on the assumption that aromatase inhibitors present in the plant might have effects in humans.
