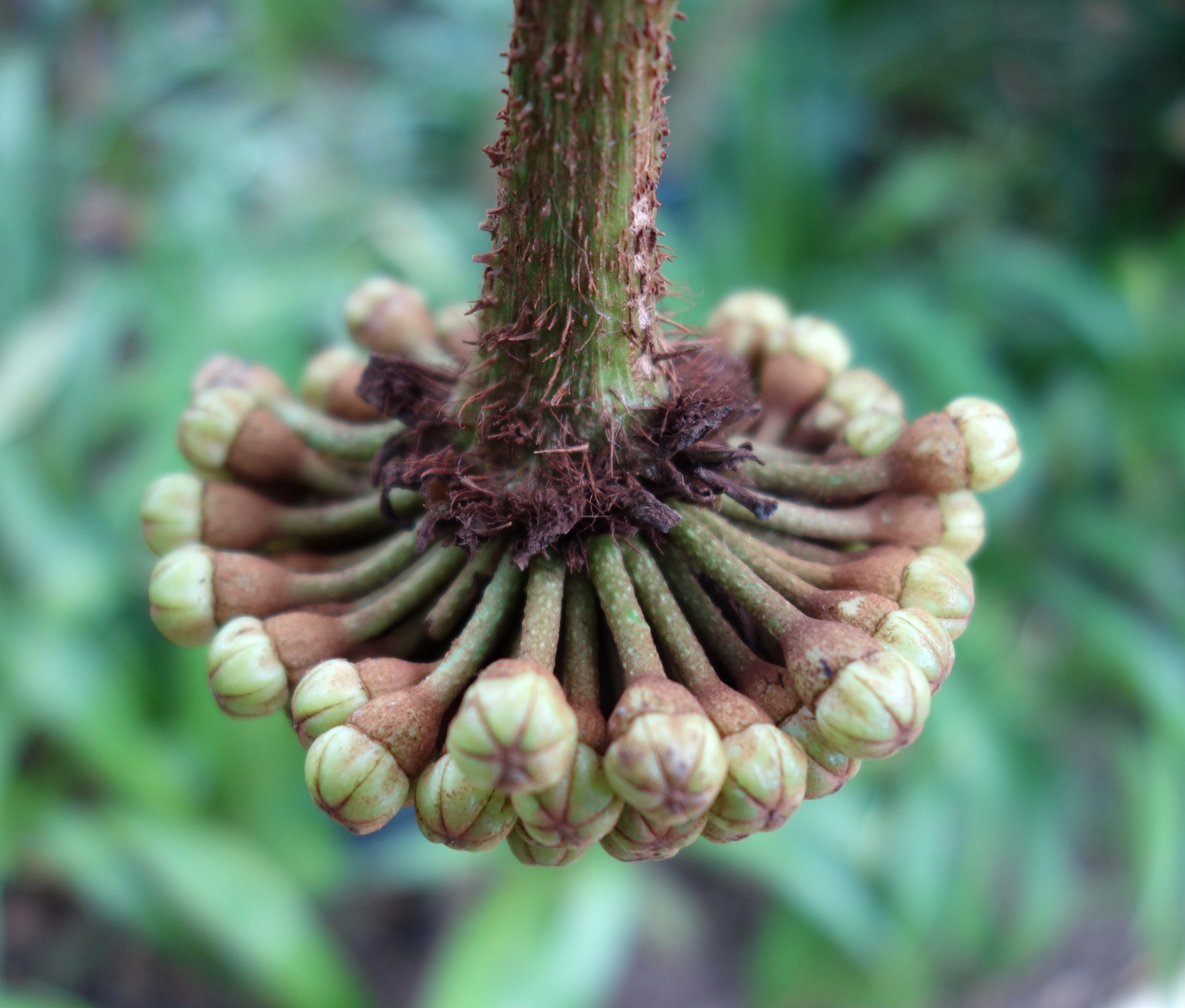

Scientific classification
- Kingdom: Plantae
- Clade: Tracheophytes
- Clade: Angiosperms
- Clade: Eudicots
- Clade: Asterids
- Order: Apiales
- Family: Araliaceae
- Genus: Brassaiopsis
- Species: B. dumicola

Binomial name
- Brassaiopsis dumicola W.W.Sm.

Synonyms
- Brassaiopsis gaussenii Bui; Euaraliopsis dumicola (W.W.Sm.) Hutch. ex G.Hoo & C.J.Tseng

= Brassaiopsis dumicola =

Species of plant

Brassaiopsis dumicola, synonym Euaraliopsis dumicola, is a species of flowering plant in the family Araliaceae, native to China (south-western Yunnan) and northern Vietnam. It was first described by William Wright Smith in 1917.

== Description ==
Brassaiopsis dumicola is a shrub or a tree, growing to 9 m tall. Its leaves have about nine deeply divided lobes. The lateral inflorescence is pendent, with umbels about 3 cm in diameter borne on branched axes. The stout pedicels are about 5–8 mm long and are surrounded by stiff bracteoles 4–10 mm long.

== Conservation ==
Euaraliopsis dumicola was assessed as "endangered" in the 2004 IUCN Red List, where it is said to be native only to Yunnan. As of February 2023, Plants of the World Online regarded E. dumicola as a synonym of Brassaiopsis dumicola, which has a wider distribution.
