= Heteropanax nitentifolius =

Conservation status
- Endangered (IUCN 3.1)

Scientific classification
- Kingdom: Plantae
- Clade: Tracheophytes
- Clade: Angiosperms
- Clade: Eudicots
- Clade: Asterids
- Order: Apiales
- Family: Araliaceae
- Genus: Heteropanax
- Species: H. nitentifolius

Binomial name
- Heteropanax nitentifolius G.Hoo

Species of plant

Heteropanax nitentifolius is a species of flowering plant in the family Araliaceae. It is a tree native to northern Vietnam and to southeastern Yunnan in south-central China.
