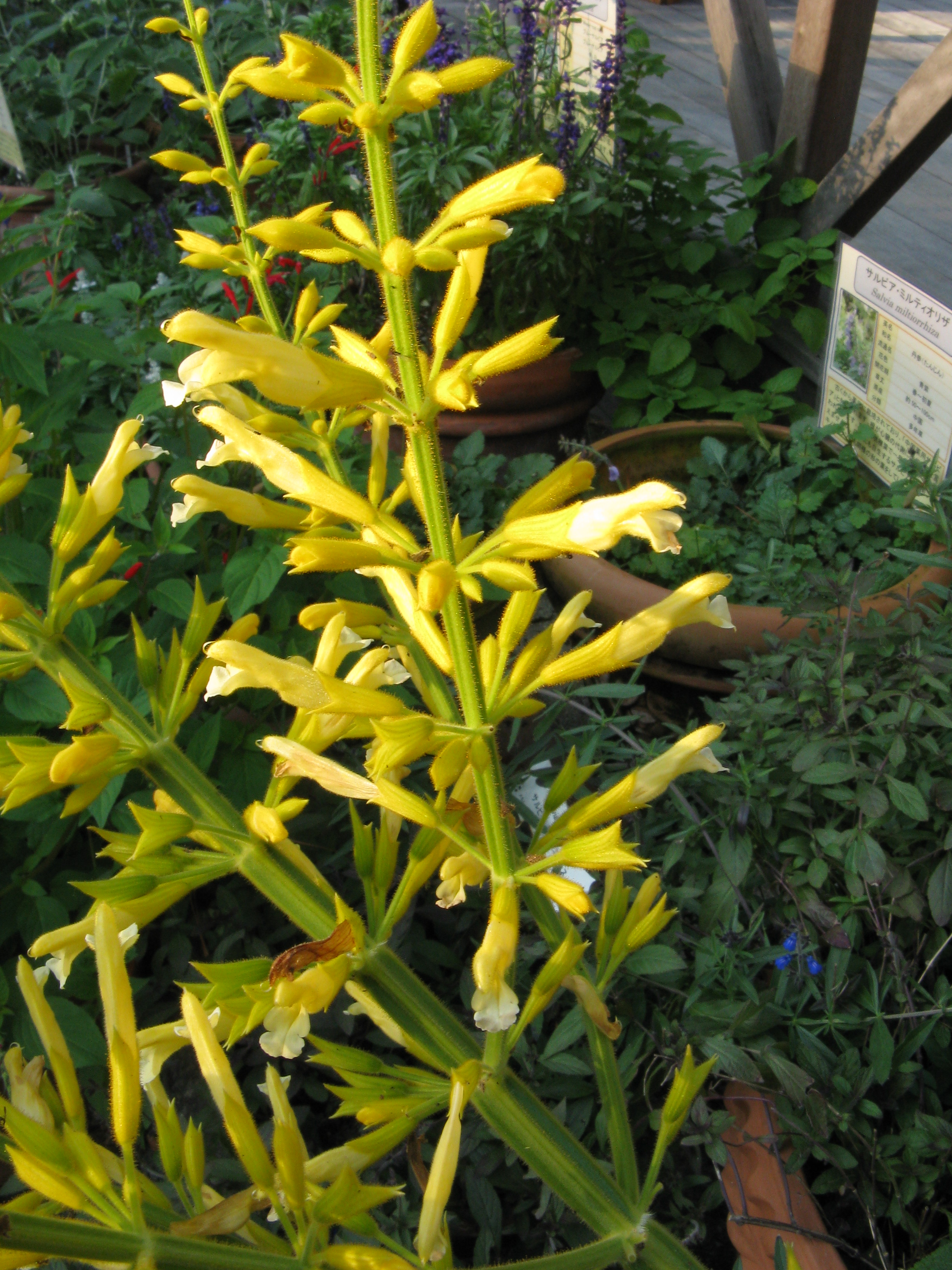

Scientific classification
- Kingdom: Plantae
- Clade: Tracheophytes
- Clade: Angiosperms
- Clade: Eudicots
- Clade: Asterids
- Order: Lamiales
- Family: Lamiaceae
- Genus: Salvia
- Species: S. madrensis

Binomial name
- Salvia madrensis Seem.

= Salvia madrensis =

Species of flowering plant

Salvia madrensis (Forsythia sage) is a yellow-flowered Salvia native to the Sierra Madre Oriental mountain range in Mexico, growing at 4,000–5,000 elevation in warm, wet areas. The specific epithet "madrensis" refers to the high mountains where it grows.

Salvia madrensis spends the first part of the growing season putting out 4–7 foot stems that are thick (2 inches) and square, with ridges on each corner emphasizing the squareness. The rough, heart-shaped spinach-green leaves are widely spaced on the stem, graduating in size from large at the bottom to smaller at the top, giving a lush covering to the plant. Numerous 12 inch inflorescences are covered with softly colored butter-yellow flowers held in whorls. The calyces are aromatic and covered with sticky glands. Blooming begins in late autumn, lasting until frost.
