= Macropanax dispermus =

Conservation status
- Least Concern (IUCN 3.1)

Scientific classification
- Kingdom: Plantae
- Clade: Tracheophytes
- Clade: Angiosperms
- Clade: Eudicots
- Clade: Asterids
- Order: Apiales
- Family: Araliaceae
- Genus: Macropanax
- Species: M. dispermus

Binomial name
- Macropanax dispermus Grierson

Synonyms
- Panax serratus Wall. ex DC. Macropanax serratifolius K.M.Feng & Y.R.Li; Macropanax oreophilus Miq. Macropanax floribundus Miq. Macropanax dispermus integer Hedera serrata Wall. Hedera disperma (Blume) DC. Cromapanax lobatus Grierson; Brassaiopsis floribunda (Miq.) K.Koch; Brassaiopsis disperma (Blume) K.Koch; Aralia disperma Blume; Aralia calyculata Zoll. & Moritzi

Species of tree

Macropanax dispermus is a species of plant in the family Araliaceae.
