= Macropanax maingayi =

Scientific classification
- Kingdom: Plantae
- Clade: Tracheophytes
- Clade: Angiosperms
- Clade: Eudicots
- Clade: Asterids
- Order: Apiales
- Family: Araliaceae
- Genus: Macropanax
- Species: M. maingayi

Binomial name
- Macropanax maingayi (C.B.Clarke) Philipson

Synonyms
- Hederopsis maingayi C.B.Clarke; Arthrophyllum trifoliatum Ridl.; Hederopsis major Ridl.

Species of tree

Macropanax maingayi is a tree in the family Araliaceae.

It was first described from Malacca as Hederopsis maingayi in 1879. William Raymond Philipson moved it to the genus Macropanax in 1979. It is native to a wide area of SE Asia, including Sumatra in Indonesia to Vietnam.

Somehow this species was added under the old synonym Hederopsis maingayi in the 1990 book Endemic trees of the Malay Peninsula by the Forestry Department of Malaysia, with the author stating it was only found in Peninsular Malaysia. Due to this mistake the IUCN claimed in 1998 it was an endemic "threatened species", claiming urban development and logging were causing its population to decline.
