= Brassaiopsis minor =

Conservation status
- Vulnerable (IUCN 2.3)

Scientific classification
- Kingdom: Plantae
- Clade: Tracheophytes
- Clade: Angiosperms
- Clade: Eudicots
- Clade: Asterids
- Order: Apiales
- Family: Araliaceae
- Genus: Brassaiopsis
- Species: B. minor

Binomial name
- Brassaiopsis minor Stone

Species of tree

Brassaiopsis minor is a species of plant in the family Araliaceae. It is a tree endemic to Peninsular Malaysia. It is threatened by habitat loss.
