= Brassaiopsis elegans =

Scientific classification
- Kingdom: Plantae
- Clade: Tracheophytes
- Clade: Angiosperms
- Clade: Eudicots
- Clade: Asterids
- Order: Apiales
- Family: Araliaceae
- Genus: Brassaiopsis
- Species: B. elegans

Binomial name
- Brassaiopsis elegans Ridl., 1913

Species of shrub

Brassaiopsis elegans is a species of shrub in the family Araliaceae.
