= Macropanax concinnus =

Conservation status
- Vulnerable (IUCN 2.3)

Scientific classification
- Kingdom: Plantae
- Clade: Tracheophytes
- Clade: Angiosperms
- Clade: Eudicots
- Clade: Asterids
- Order: Apiales
- Family: Araliaceae
- Genus: Macropanax
- Species: M. concinnus

Binomial name
- Macropanax concinnus Miq.

Species of plant

Macropanax concinnus is a species of plant in the family Araliaceae. It is a tree endemic to Java in Indonesia. It is a vulnerable species threatened by habitat loss.
