= Heteropanax yunnanensis =

Conservation status
- Endangered (IUCN 3.1)

Scientific classification
- Kingdom: Plantae
- Clade: Embryophytes
- Clade: Tracheophytes
- Clade: Spermatophytes
- Clade: Angiosperms
- Clade: Eudicots
- Clade: Asterids
- Order: Apiales
- Family: Araliaceae
- Genus: Heteropanax
- Species: H. yunnanensis

Binomial name
- Heteropanax yunnanensis G.Hoo

Species of flowering plant

Heteropanax yunnanensis is a species of flowering plant in the family Araliaceae. It is a small tree endemic to southwestern Yunnan in south-central China.
