= Brassaiopsis kwangsiensis =

Conservation status
- Endangered (IUCN 3.1)

Scientific classification
- Kingdom: Plantae
- Clade: Tracheophytes
- Clade: Angiosperms
- Clade: Eudicots
- Clade: Asterids
- Order: Apiales
- Family: Araliaceae
- Genus: Brassaiopsis
- Species: B. kwangsiensis

Binomial name
- Brassaiopsis kwangsiensis G.Hoo

Species of flowering plant

Brassaiopsis kwangsiensis is a species of plant in the family Araliaceae. It is a shrub endemic to Guangxi, Guizhou, and Yunnan in southern China.
