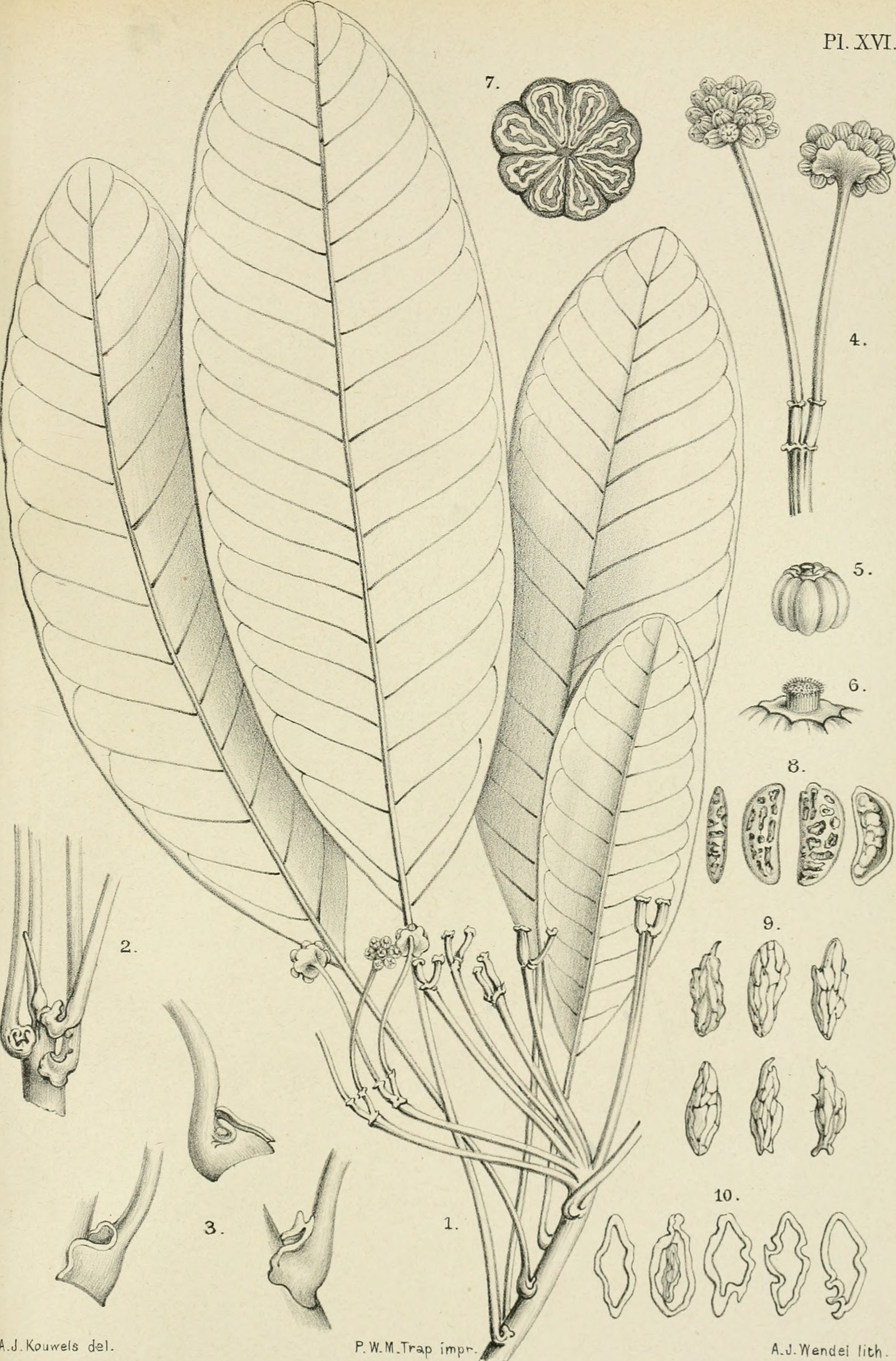
- Osmoxylon miquelii, botanical sketch

Conservation status
- Data Deficient (IUCN 2.3)

Scientific classification
- Kingdom: Plantae
- Clade: Tracheophytes
- Clade: Angiosperms
- Clade: Eudicots
- Clade: Asterids
- Order: Apiales
- Family: Araliaceae
- Genus: Osmoxylon
- Species: O. miquelii

Binomial name
- Osmoxylon miquelii Boerl.

= Osmoxylon miquelii =

Species of flowering plant

Osmoxylon miquelii is a species of plant in the family Araliaceae. It is endemic to West Papua (Indonesia).
