= Merrilliopanax alpinus =

Conservation status
- Vulnerable (IUCN 3.1)

Scientific classification
- Kingdom: Plantae
- Clade: Tracheophytes
- Clade: Angiosperms
- Clade: Eudicots
- Clade: Asterids
- Order: Apiales
- Family: Araliaceae
- Genus: Merrilliopanax
- Species: M. alpinus

Binomial name
- Merrilliopanax alpinus (C.B.Clarke) C.B.Shang

Synonyms
- Tetrapanax tibetanus C.Ho

Species of tree

Merrilliopanax alpinus is a species of plant in the family Araliaceae. It is found in Tibet (China), Bhutan, northeast India, and Nepal.
