= Osmoxylon arrhenicum =

Conservation status
- Data Deficient (IUCN 3.1)

Scientific classification
- Kingdom: Plantae
- Clade: Tracheophytes
- Clade: Angiosperms
- Clade: Eudicots
- Clade: Asterids
- Order: Apiales
- Family: Araliaceae
- Genus: Osmoxylon
- Species: O. arrhenicum

Binomial name
- Osmoxylon arrhenicum Conn & Frodin

Species of flowering plant

Osmoxylon arrhenicum is a species of plant in the family Araliaceae. It is endemic to Papua New Guinea.
