= A. malayanus =

A. malayanus may refer to:

- Acanthopanax malayanus, a plant species
- Anthracoceros malayanus, a bird species

== See also ==
- Malayanus
