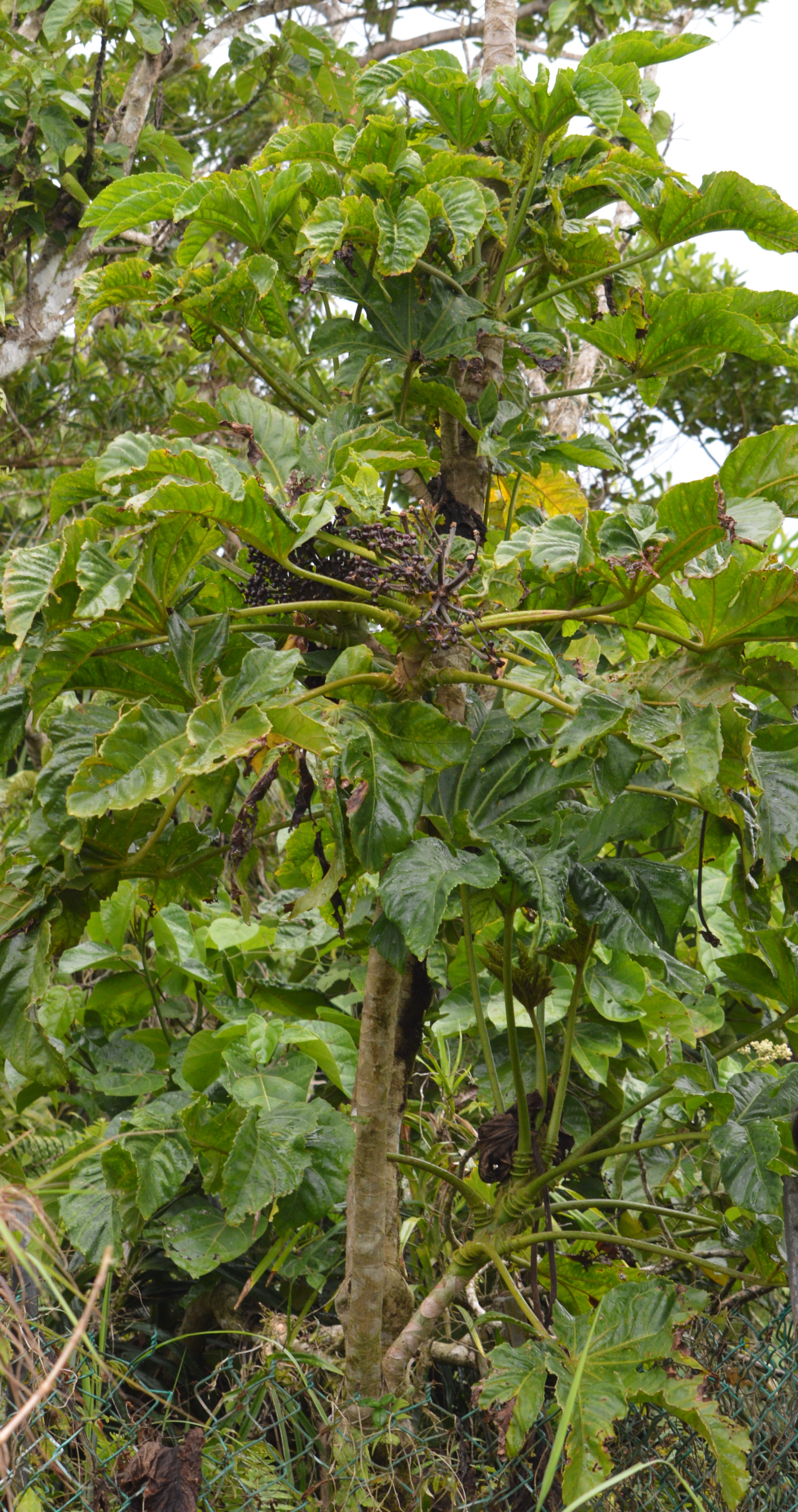

Conservation status
- Critically Endangered (IUCN 2.3)

- Endangered (ESA)

Scientific classification
- Kingdom: Plantae
- Clade: Tracheophytes
- Clade: Angiosperms
- Clade: Eudicots
- Clade: Asterids
- Order: Apiales
- Family: Araliaceae
- Genus: Osmoxylon
- Species: O. mariannense

Binomial name
- Osmoxylon mariannense (Kaneh.) Fosb. & Sachet

Synonyms
- Boerlagiodendron mariannense Kaneh.

= Osmoxylon mariannense =

Species of tree

Osmoxylon mariannense is a rare species of tree in the family Araliaceae. It is endemic to Rota, one of the Northern Mariana Islands. A 2002 survey found only eight mature trees remaining on the island. A resident of the commonwealth, the tree is federally listed as an endangered species of the United States.

== See also ==
List of endemic plants in the Mariana Islands
