= Frodinia gleasonii =

Conservation status
- Vulnerable (IUCN 2.3)

Scientific classification
- Kingdom: Plantae
- Clade: Tracheophytes
- Clade: Angiosperms
- Clade: Eudicots
- Clade: Asterids
- Order: Apiales
- Family: Araliaceae
- Genus: Frodinia
- Species: F. gleasonii

Binomial name
- Frodinia gleasonii (Britt. & Wilson) Lowry & G.M.Plunkett

Synonyms
- Didymopanax gleasonii Britton & P.Wilson (1926); Schefflera gleasonii (Britton & P.Wilson) Alain (1985)

Species of plant

Frodinia gleasonii, the yuquilla, is a species of plant in the family Araliaceae. It is endemic to Puerto Rico. It is found in ultramafic soils in the Cordillera Central. It is a montane forest tree.
