= Brassaiopsis acuminata =

Conservation status
- Endangered (IUCN 3.1)

Scientific classification
- Kingdom: Plantae
- Clade: Tracheophytes
- Clade: Angiosperms
- Clade: Eudicots
- Clade: Asterids
- Order: Apiales
- Family: Araliaceae
- Genus: Brassaiopsis
- Species: B. acuminata

Binomial name
- Brassaiopsis acuminata H.L.Li

Species of flowering plant

Brassaiopsis acuminata is a species of plant in the family Araliaceae. It is endemic to China.
