= Macropanax chienii =

Conservation status
- Vulnerable (IUCN 3.1)

Scientific classification
- Kingdom: Plantae
- Clade: Tracheophytes
- Clade: Angiosperms
- Clade: Eudicots
- Clade: Asterids
- Order: Apiales
- Family: Araliaceae
- Genus: Macropanax
- Species: M. chienii

Binomial name
- Macropanax chienii C.Ho.

Species of plant

Macropanax chienii is a species of plant in the family Araliaceae. It is endemic to China.
