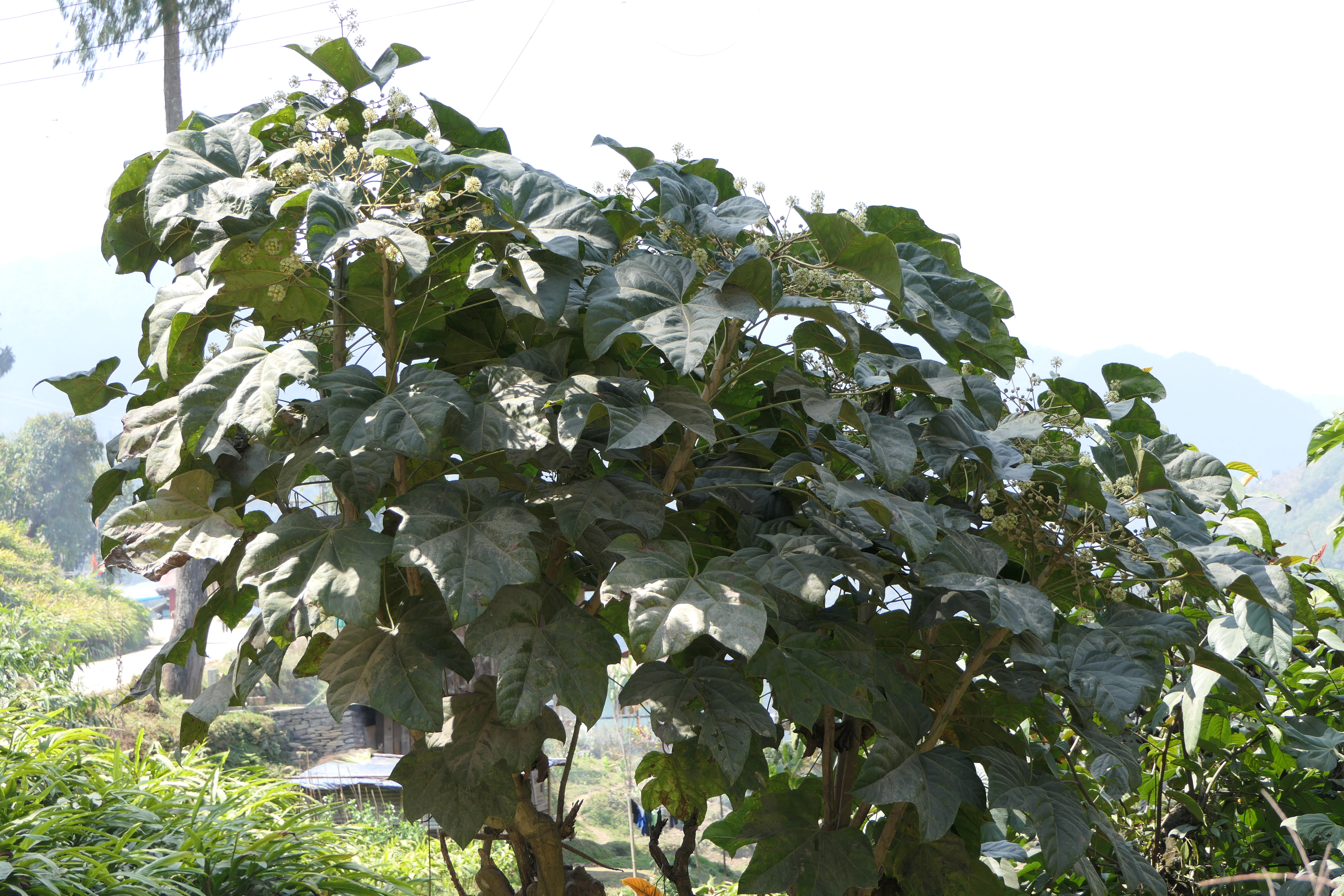

Scientific classification
- Kingdom: Plantae
- Clade: Tracheophytes
- Clade: Angiosperms
- Clade: Eudicots
- Clade: Asterids
- Order: Apiales
- Family: Araliaceae
- Genus: Brassaiopsis
- Species: B. hainla

Binomial name
- Brassaiopsis hainla (Buch.-Ham.) Seem.

= Brassaiopsis hainla =

Species of tree

Brassaiopsis hainla is a species of shrub in the family Araliaceae. It is used as fodder by the farmers in Nepal.
