= Merrilliopanax listeri =

Conservation status
- Least Concern (IUCN 3.1)

Scientific classification
- Kingdom: Plantae
- Clade: Tracheophytes
- Clade: Angiosperms
- Clade: Eudicots
- Clade: Asterids
- Order: Apiales
- Family: Araliaceae
- Genus: Merrilliopanax
- Species: M. listeri

Binomial name
- Merrilliopanax listeri (King) H.L.Li

Synonyms
- Dendropanax listeri King; Gilibertia listeri (King) Hand.-Mazz.; Merrilliopanax chinensis H.L.Li

Species of plant

Merrilliopanax listeri is a species of flowering plant in the family Araliaceae. It is native to the east Himalayas, Nepal, south-central China and Myanmar. It was first described by George King in 1898 as Dendropanax listeri.

== Conservation ==
Merrilliopanax chinensis was assessed as "critically endangered" in the 2004 IUCN Red List, where it is said to be native only to Yunnan in China. As of February 2023, M. chinensis was regarded as a synonym of Merrilliopanax listeri, which has a wider distribution, including the Himalayas and Myanmar.
