= Anakasia =

Scientific classification
- Kingdom: Plantae
- Clade: Tracheophytes
- Clade: Angiosperms
- Clade: Eudicots
- Clade: Asterids
- Order: Apiales
- Family: Araliaceae
- Subfamily: Aralioideae
- Genus: Anakasia; Philipson
- Species: A. simplicifolia

Binomial name
- Anakasia simplicifolia Philipson

Genus of flowering plants

Anakasia simplicifolia is a species of plant in the family Araliaceae, the only species of the genus Anakasia. It is endemic to Western New Guinea.
