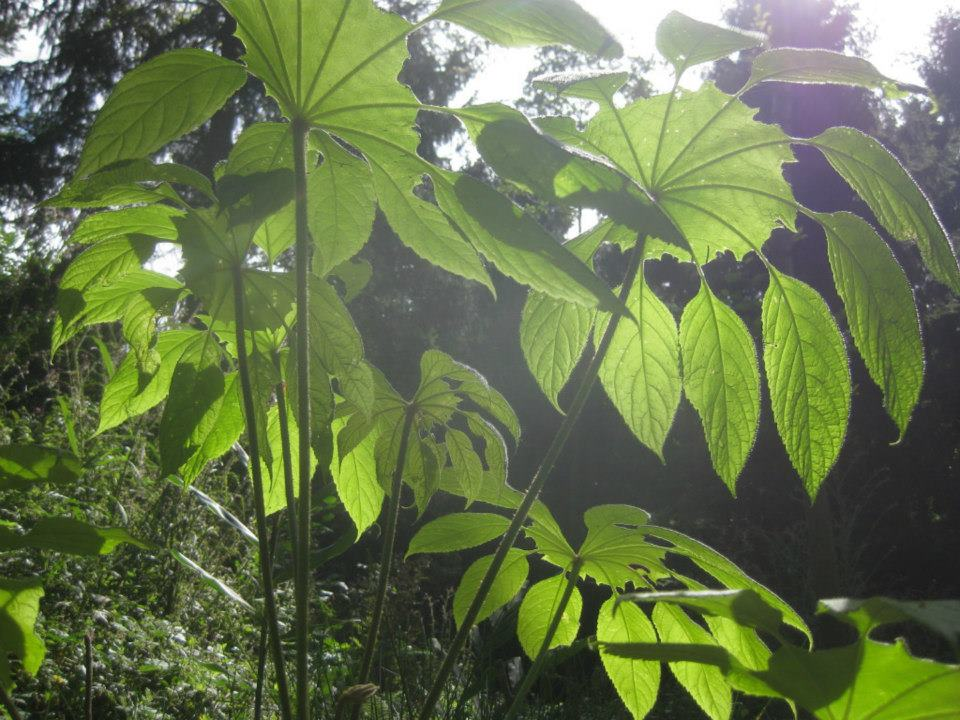
- Brassaiopsis mitis

Scientific classification
- Kingdom: Plantae
- Clade: Tracheophytes
- Clade: Angiosperms
- Clade: Eudicots
- Clade: Asterids
- Order: Apiales
- Family: Araliaceae
- Subfamily: Aralioideae
- Genus: Brassaiopsis; Decne. & Planch.

Synonyms
- Araliopsis Kurz; Euaraliopsis Hutch.; Grushvitzkya Skvortsova & Aver.; Pseudobrassaiopsis R.N.Banerjee; Wardenia King

= Brassaiopsis =

Genus of flowering plants

Brassaiopsis is a genus of shrubs in the family Araliaceae. There are about 45 species, distributed in Asia from the Himalaya through China, Vietnam, Thailand to Indonesia.

== Species ==
Species include:

- Brassaiopsis aculeata (Buch.-Ham. ex D.Don) Seem.
- Brassaiopsis acuminata H.L.Li
- Brassaiopsis andamanica R.N.Banerjee
- Brassaiopsis angustifolia K.M.Feng
- Brassaiopsis bodinieri (H.Lév.) J.Wen & Lowry
- Brassaiopsis calcarea Craib
- Brassaiopsis castaneifolia Philipson
- Brassaiopsis chengkangensis Hu
- Brassaiopsis ciliata Dunn
- Brassaiopsis dumicola W.W.Sm.
- Brassaiopsis elegans Ridl.
- Brassaiopsis fatsioides Harms
- Brassaiopsis ferruginea (H.L.Li) G.Hoo
- Brassaiopsis ficifolia Dunn
- Brassaiopsis ficifolioides J.Wen & Lowry
- Brassaiopsis floribunda (Miq.) Seem.
- Brassaiopsis gigantea J.Wen & Lowry
- Brassaiopsis glomerulata (Blume) Regel
- Brassaiopsis gracilis Hand.-Mazz.
- Brassaiopsis griffithii C.B.Clarke
- Brassaiopsis grushvitzkyi J.Wen, Lowry & T.H.Nguyên
- Brassaiopsis hainla (Buch.-Ham.) Seem.
- Brassaiopsis hispida Seem.
- Brassaiopsis hookeri C.B.Clarke
- Brassaiopsis kwangsiensis G.Hoo
- Brassaiopsis liana Y.F.Deng
- Brassaiopsis magnifica Dunn
- Brassaiopsis minor B.C.Stone
- Brassaiopsis mitis C.B.Clarke
- Brassaiopsis moumingensis (Y.R.Ling) C.B.Shang
- Brassaiopsis nhatrangensis (Bui) J.Wen & Lowry
- Brassaiopsis phanrangensis C.B.Shang
- Brassaiopsis producta (Dunn) C.B.Shang
- Brassaiopsis pseudoficifolia Lowry & C.B.Shang
- Brassaiopsis quercifolia G.Hoo
- Brassaiopsis resecta (Miq.) Esser & Jebb
- Brassaiopsis rockii Merr.
- Brassaiopsis rufosetosa (Ridl.) Jebb
- Brassaiopsis shweliensis W.W.Sm.
- Brassaiopsis simplex (King) B.C.Stone
- Brassaiopsis simplicifolia C.B.Clarke
- Brassaiopsis stellata K.M.Feng
- Brassaiopsis sumatrana (Miq.) Ridl.
- Brassaiopsis tibetana C.B.Shang
- Brassaiopsis triloba K.M.Feng
- Brassaiopsis trilobata Merr.
- Brassaiopsis tripteris (H.Lév.) Rehder
- Brassaiopsis variabilis C.B.Shang
