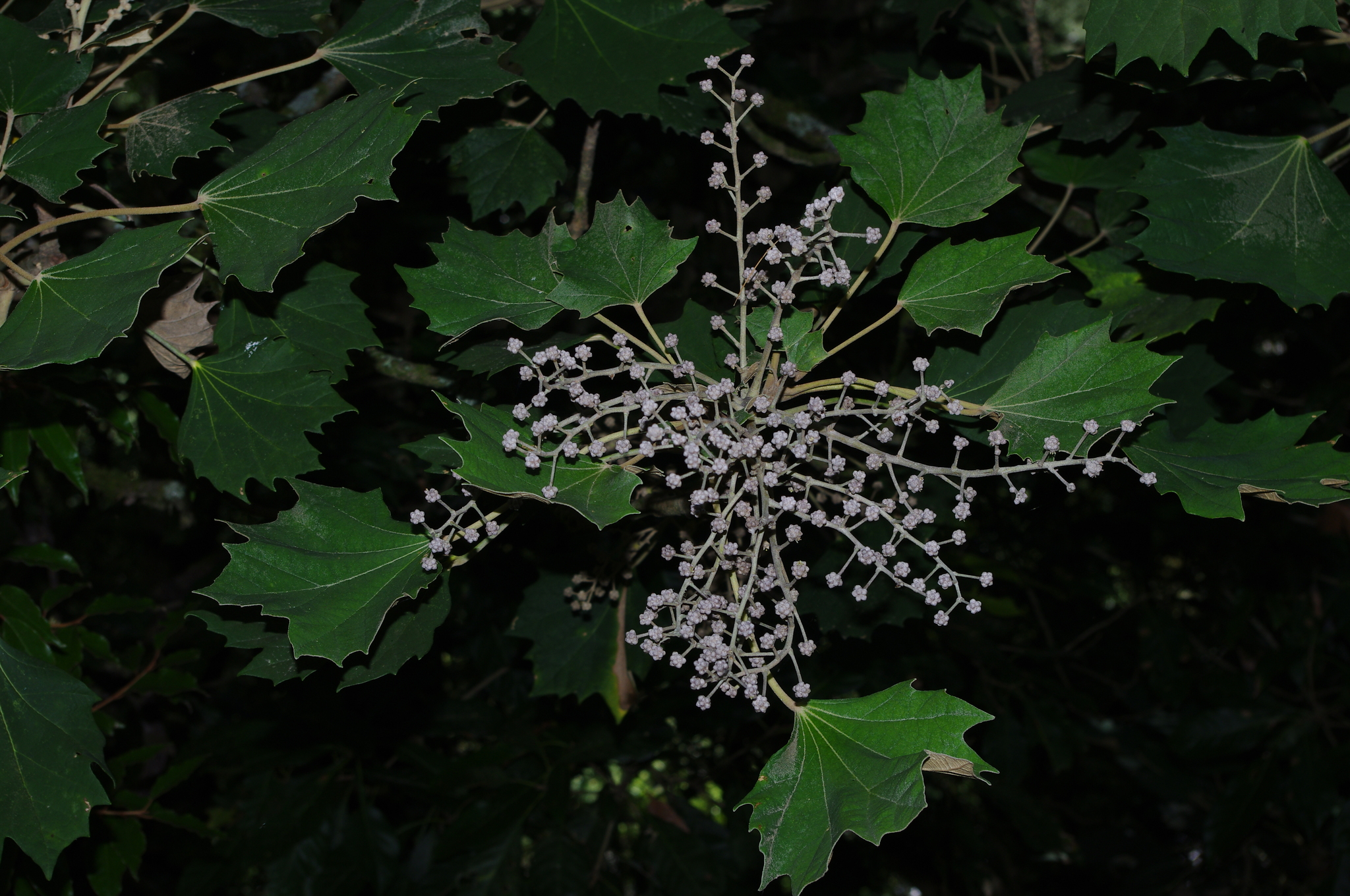
- Sinopanax formosanus

Conservation status
- Vulnerable (IUCN 3.1)

Scientific classification
- Kingdom: Plantae
- Clade: Tracheophytes
- Clade: Angiosperms
- Clade: Eudicots
- Clade: Asterids
- Order: Apiales
- Family: Araliaceae
- Subfamily: Aralioideae
- Genus: Sinopanax; H.L.Li
- Species: S. formosanus

Binomial name
- Sinopanax formosanus (Hayata) H.L.Li

= Sinopanax =

Genus of trees

Sinopanax formosanus is a species of flowering plant in the family Araliaceae and the only species in the genus Sinopanax. It is endemic to Taiwan. It is a small, evergreen tree, up to 12 metres (39 ft) in height, that grows in open areas in mountainous forests at altitudes between 2,300–2,600 metres (7,500–8,500 ft).
