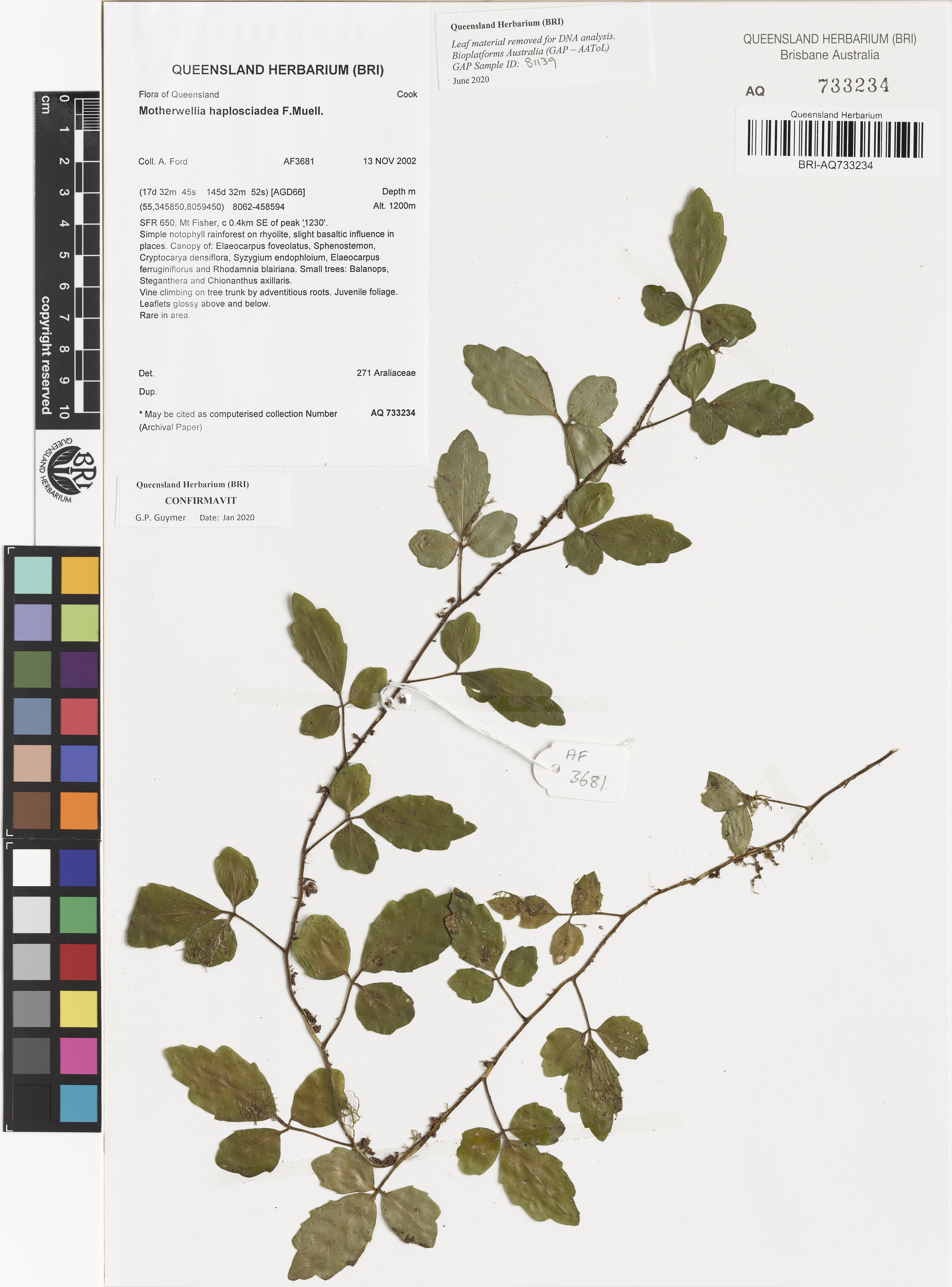
- Herbarium specimen with flowers

Scientific classification
- Kingdom: Plantae
- Clade: Tracheophytes
- Clade: Angiosperms
- Clade: Eudicots
- Clade: Asterids
- Order: Apiales
- Family: Araliaceae
- Subfamily: Aralioideae
- Genus: Motherwellia; F.Muell.
- Species: M. haplosciadea

Binomial name
- Motherwellia haplosciadea F.Muell.

Synonyms
- Aralia motherwellii F.Muell.

= Motherwellia =

Motherwellia haplosciadea

Genus of flowering plants

Motherwellia is a monotypic genus (a genus containing a single species) of plant in the ginseng and ivy family Araliaceae. The sole species in the genus is Motherwellia haplosciadea, a vine that is endemic to Queensland, Australia.

== Description ==
Motherwellia haplosciadea is a small woody root climber with stem diameters up to 7 cm (2.8 in) having been recorded. It has trifoliate leaves arranged alternately on the stems. The leaflets are shiny and may reach 14 cm (5.5 in) long and 6 cm (2.4 in) wide, and the petiolules may be absent or up to 10 mm (0.4 in) long. The dark red flowers have five petals and are about 10 mm (0.4 in) wide. They are produced in terminal umbels. The fruit is a pink or red drupe measuring about 9 mm (0.4 in) wide and long, slightly flattened. It contains two brown seeds about 6 mm (0.2 in) long.

=== Phenology ===
Flowering occurs between January and July, fruit appear from December to July.

== Distribution and habitat ==
This species grows in rainforest, often on soils derived from basalt or granite. The natural range is from the area around Ngalba Bulal National Park (formerly Cedar Bay National Park), south to Paluma Range National Park, at altitudes from about 140 to 1,400 m (460 to 4,590 ft).
