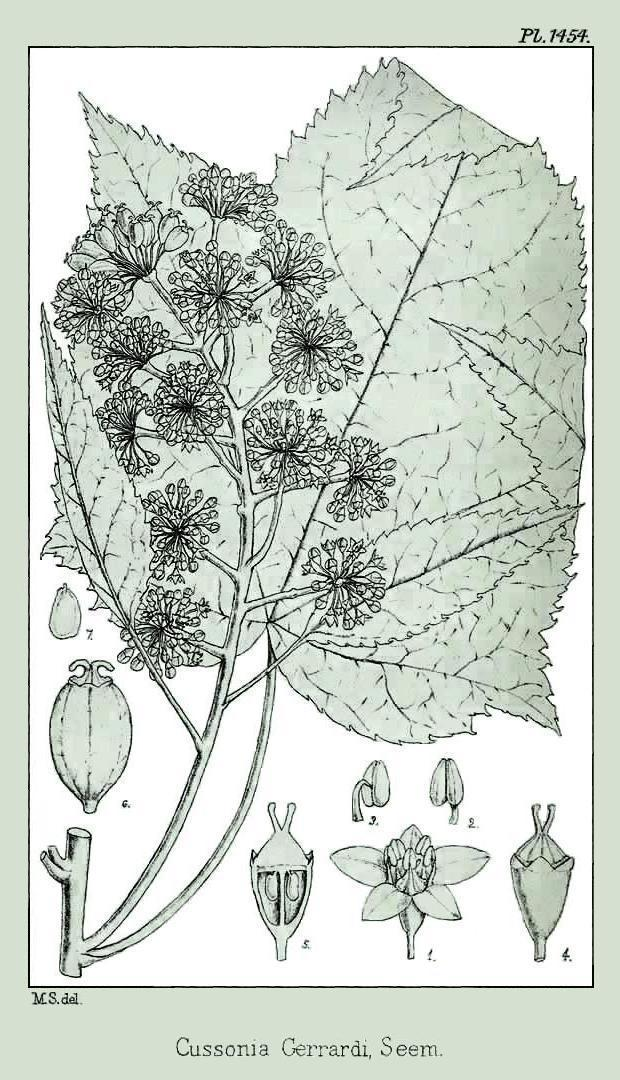

Scientific classification
- Kingdom: Plantae
- Clade: Tracheophytes
- Clade: Angiosperms
- Clade: Eudicots
- Clade: Asterids
- Order: Apiales
- Family: Araliaceae
- Subfamily: Aralioideae
- Genus: Seemannaralia; R.Vig.
- Species: S. gerrardii

Binomial name
- Seemannaralia gerrardii (Seem.) R.Vig.

Synonyms
- Cussonia gerrardii Seem.; Panax gerrardii (Seem.) Harv.

= Seemannaralia =

Wild-maple

Genus of flowering plants

Seemannaralia gerrardii, commonly known as the wild-maple or mock carrot tree, is a species of flowering plant in the family Araliaceae. It is the sole member of genus Seemannaralia, and is endemic to South Africa, where it occurs in the Eastern Cape, KwaZulu-Natal, Limpopo and Mpumalanga provinces. It was originally included in genus Cussonia. Seemann- and gerrardii commemorate Berthold Seemann and William Gerrard respectively, while -aralia suggests the family or its type genus, Aralia.

== Description ==
A short squat tree of open rocky situations, or a tall tree of forest and forest edge. The rough grey bark is deeply cracked. As with genus Cussonia the leaves are clustered at the ends of branches. The leaf shape is characteristic: maple-like, palmate and 3 to 7 lobed. Leaves turn yellow in autumn.

=== Flowers and fruit ===
The small, yellowish green flowers are produced in autumn, in axillary and terminal panicles of umbels. The oval flower petals have an intricate estivation. The superior ovary is 1 or 2-locular, and much compressed laterally. The purplish drupes appear in winter. They are of a flattened, elliptic shape, with lateral veins.

== Gallery ==
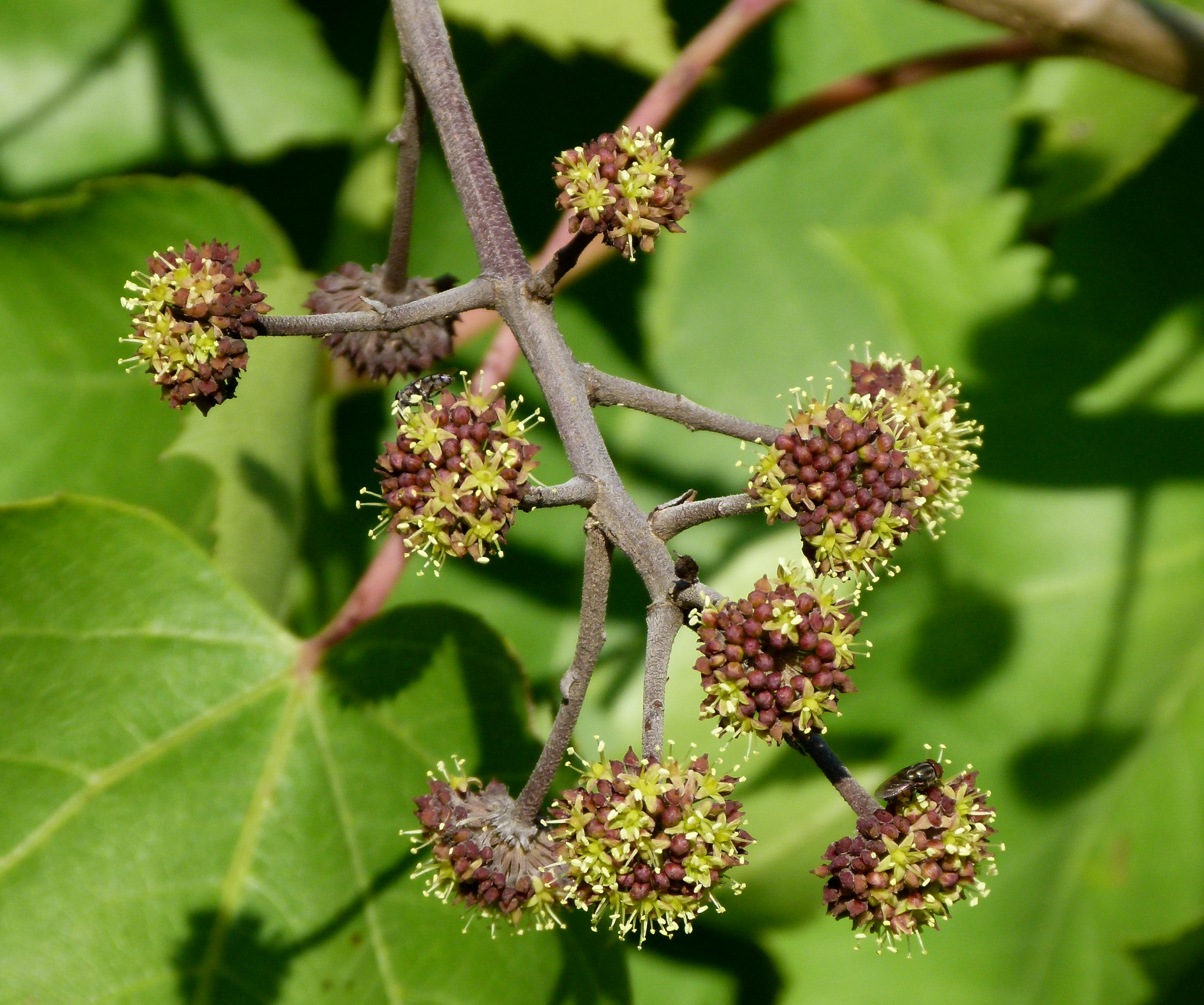
Panicle of flower umbels

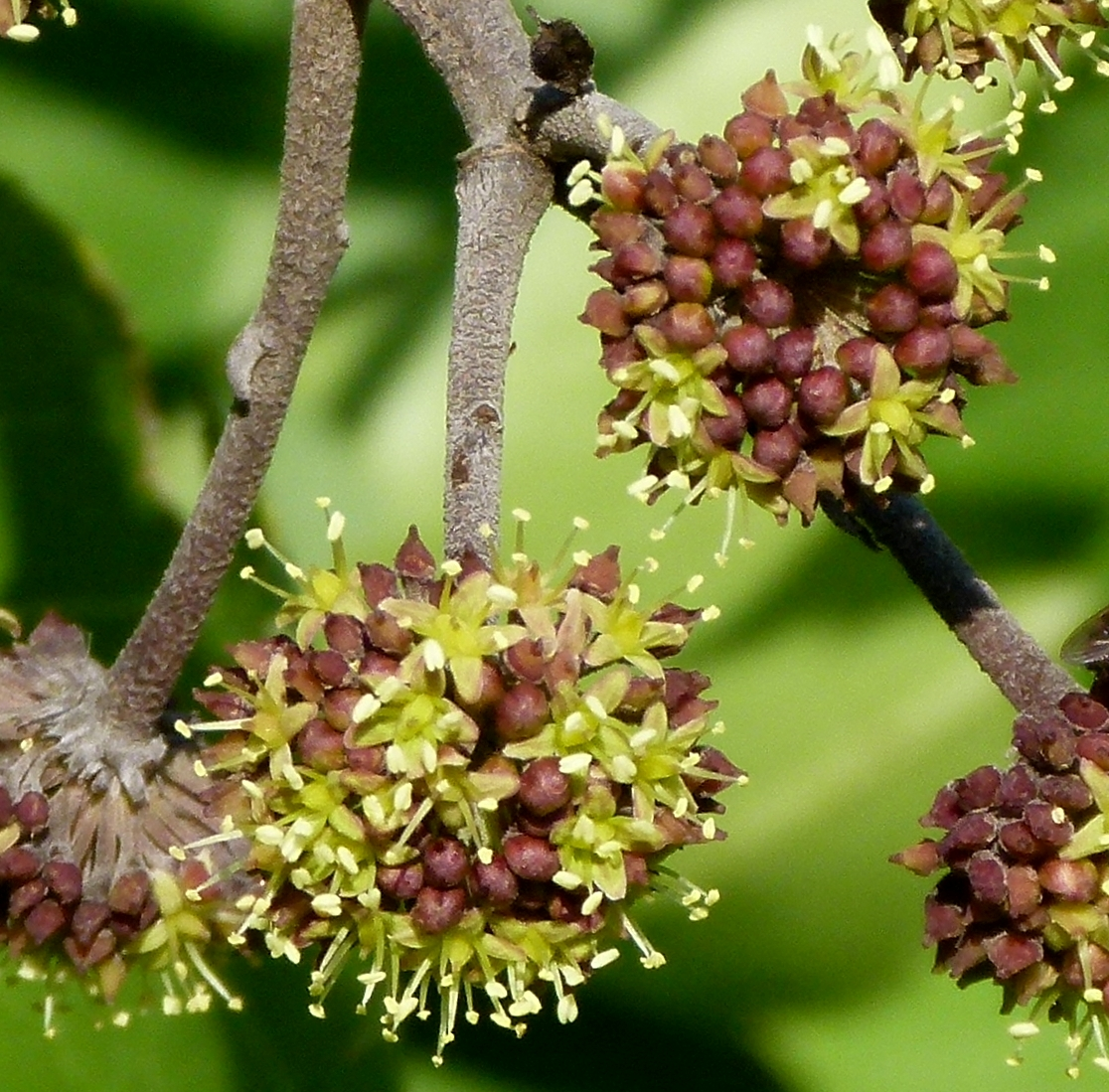
Close-up of two flower umbels
