= Gamblea malayana =

Conservation status
- Conservation Dependent (IUCN 2.3)

Scientific classification
- Kingdom: Plantae
- Clade: Tracheophytes
- Clade: Angiosperms
- Clade: Eudicots
- Clade: Asterids
- Order: Apiales
- Family: Araliaceae
- Genus: Gamblea
- Species: G. malayana

Binomial name
- Gamblea malayana (M.R.Hend.) C.B. Shang, Lowry & Frodin

Synonyms
- Acanthopanax malayanus M.R.Hend.; Eleutherococcus malayanus (M.R.Hend.) B.C.Stone; Evodiopanax malayanus (M.R.Hend.) C.B.Shang & J.Y.Huang

Species of tree

Gamblea malayana is a species of plant in the family Araliaceae. It is a tree endemic to Peninsular Malaysia. It is threatened by habitat loss.
