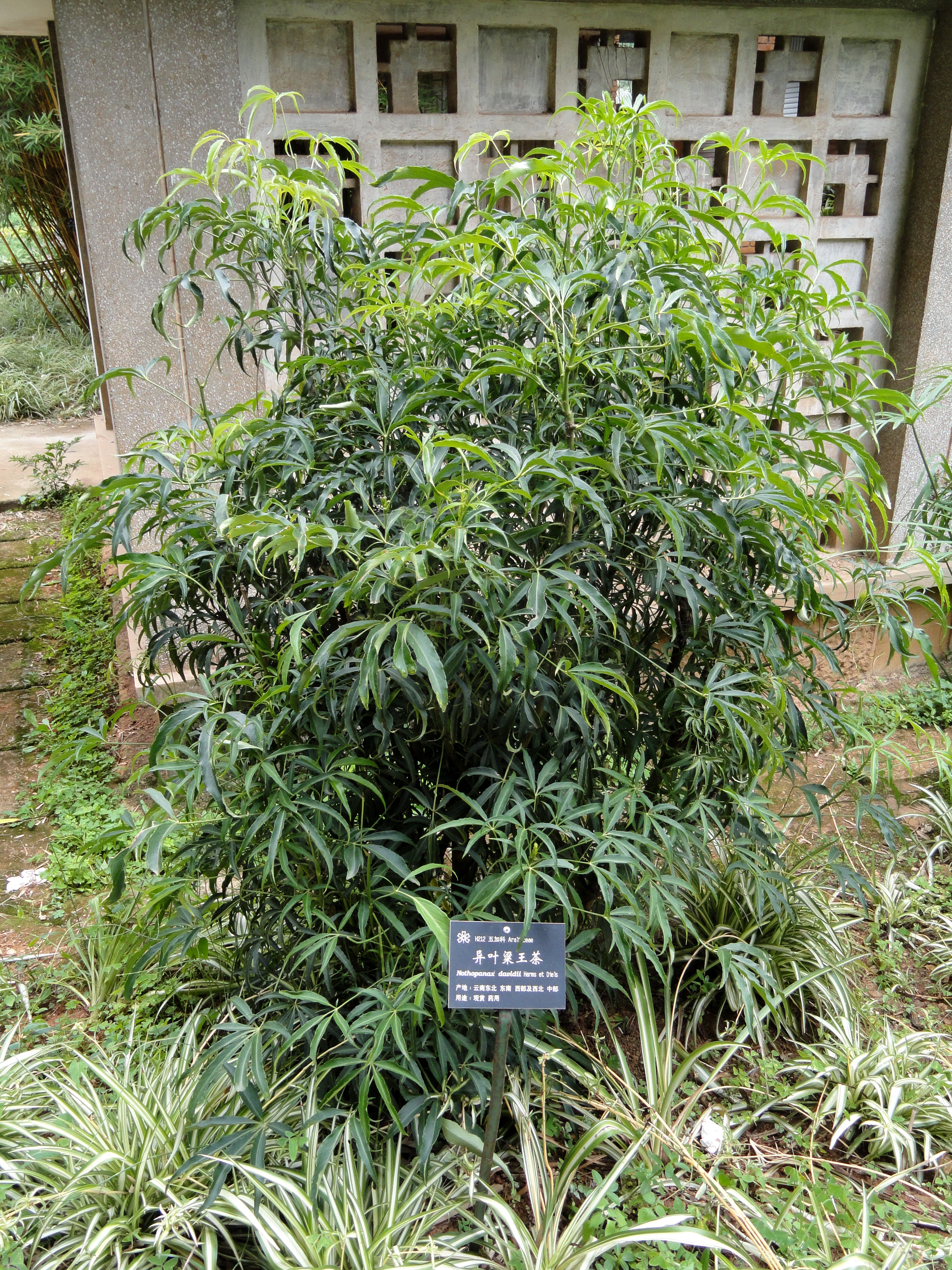

Scientific classification
- Kingdom: Plantae
- Clade: Tracheophytes
- Clade: Angiosperms
- Clade: Eudicots
- Clade: Asterids
- Order: Apiales
- Family: Araliaceae
- Subfamily: Aralioideae
- Genus: Metapanax; J.Wen & Frodin (2001)

Species
- Metapanax davidii (Franch.) J.Wen & Frodin; Metapanax delavayi (Franch.) J.Wen & Frodin

= Metapanax =

Genus of flowering plants

Metapanax is a genus of flowering plants in the family Araliaceae, comprising two species. They are endemic to central and southern China and Vietnam.
