= Cephalopanax =

Scientific classification
- Kingdom: Plantae
- Clade: Embryophytes
- Clade: Tracheophytes
- Clade: Angiosperms
- Clade: Eudicots
- Clade: Asterids
- Clade: Campanulids
- Order: Apiales
- Family: Araliaceae
- Genus: Cephalopanax; G.M.Plunkett, Lowry & D.A.Neill (2021)

Species
- Cephalopanax jahnii (Harms) G.M.Plunkett, Lowry & D.A.Neill; Cephalopanax pachycephalus (Planch. & Linden ex Harms) G.M.Plunkett, Lowry & D.A.Neill

Genus of flowering plants

Cephalopanax is a genus of plants in the family Araliaceae. It contains two species, which were until 2021 classed in other Araliaceae genera:

- Cephalopanax jahnii (Harms) G.M.Plunkett, Lowry & D.A.Neill – Colombia and Venezuela
- Cephalopanax pachycephalus (Planch. & Linden ex Harms) G.M.Plunkett, Lowry & D.A.Neill – Colombia and Venezuela (Tachira)
