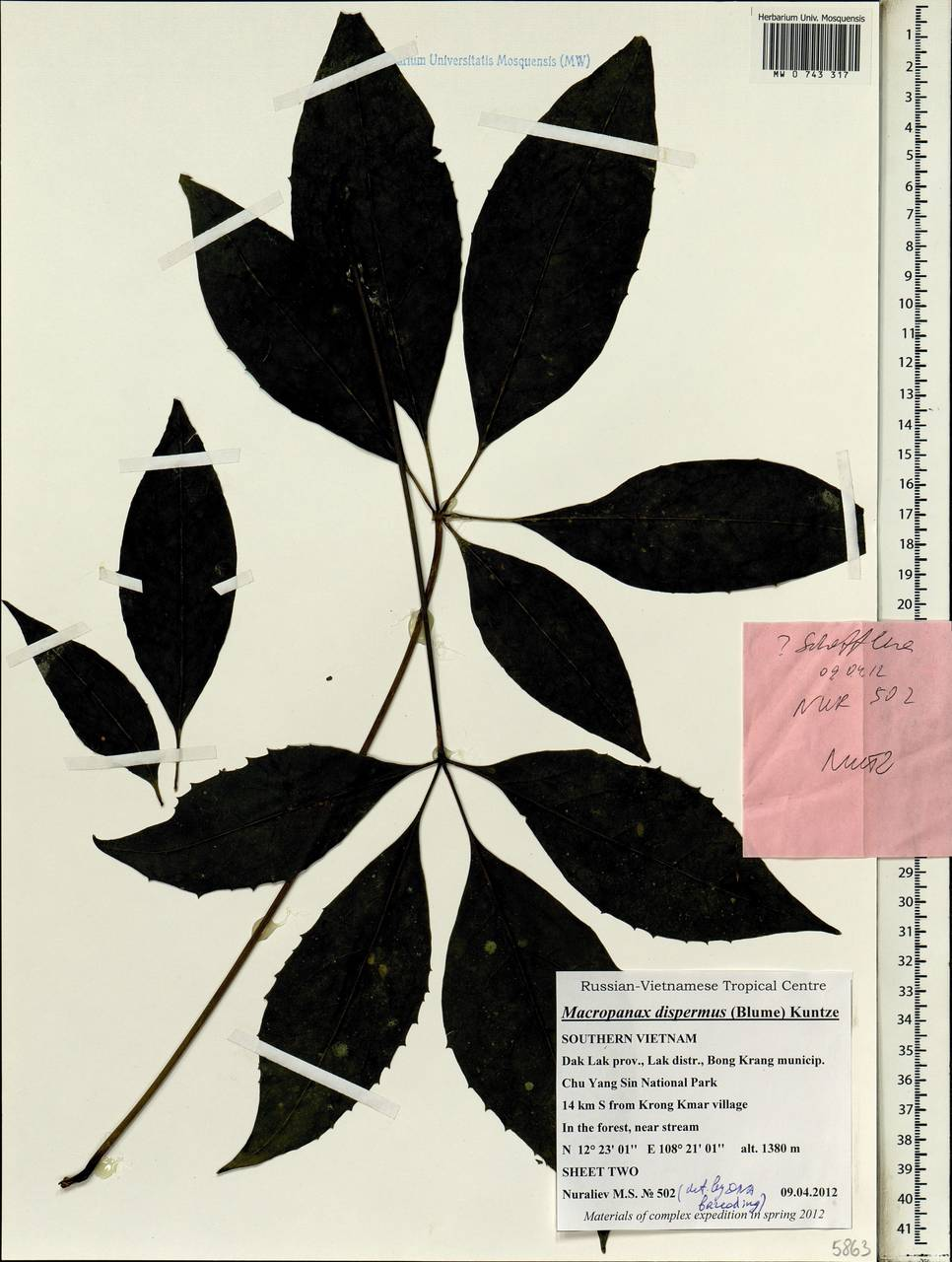
- Macropanax dispermus

Scientific classification
- Kingdom: Plantae
- Clade: Tracheophytes
- Clade: Angiosperms
- Clade: Eudicots
- Clade: Asterids
- Order: Apiales
- Family: Araliaceae
- Subfamily: Aralioideae
- Genus: Macropanax; Miq.

Species
- See text

Synonyms
- Cromapanax Grierson; Hederopsis C.B.Clarke

= Macropanax =

Genus of plants

Macropanax is a genus of flowering plants of the family Araliaceae, comprising 20 species. They are distributed from Central China to Sikkim, Nepal and Bhutan and to western Malaysia.

Species include:

- Macropanax baviensis
- Macropanax chienii
- Macropanax concinnus
- Macropanax decandrus
- Macropanax dispermus
- Macropanax grushvitzkii
- Macropanax maingayi
- Macropanax meghalayensis
- Macropanax membranifolius
- Macropanax paucinervis
- Macropanax rosthornii
- Macropanax schmidii
- Macropanax sessilis
- Macropanax simplicifolius
- Macropanax skvortsovii
- Macropanax undulatus
- Macropanax vidalii
