= Woodburnia =

Conservation status
- Data Deficient (IUCN 3.1)

Scientific classification
- Kingdom: Plantae
- Clade: Tracheophytes
- Clade: Angiosperms
- Clade: Eudicots
- Clade: Asterids
- Order: Apiales
- Family: Araliaceae
- Subfamily: Aralioideae
- Genus: Woodburnia; Prain
- Species: W. penduliflora

Binomial name
- Woodburnia penduliflora Prain

Genus of plants

Woodburnia penduliflora is a species of flowering plant in the family Araliaceae and the only representative of the genus Woodburnia. It is endemic to Burma and was first described from the Kachin State in 1903. The genus was named after the former president of the Asiatic Society of Bengal and lieutenant governor of Bengal, John Woodburn. It was described by botanist David Prain as having striking flowers unusually large for the Araliaceae family.
