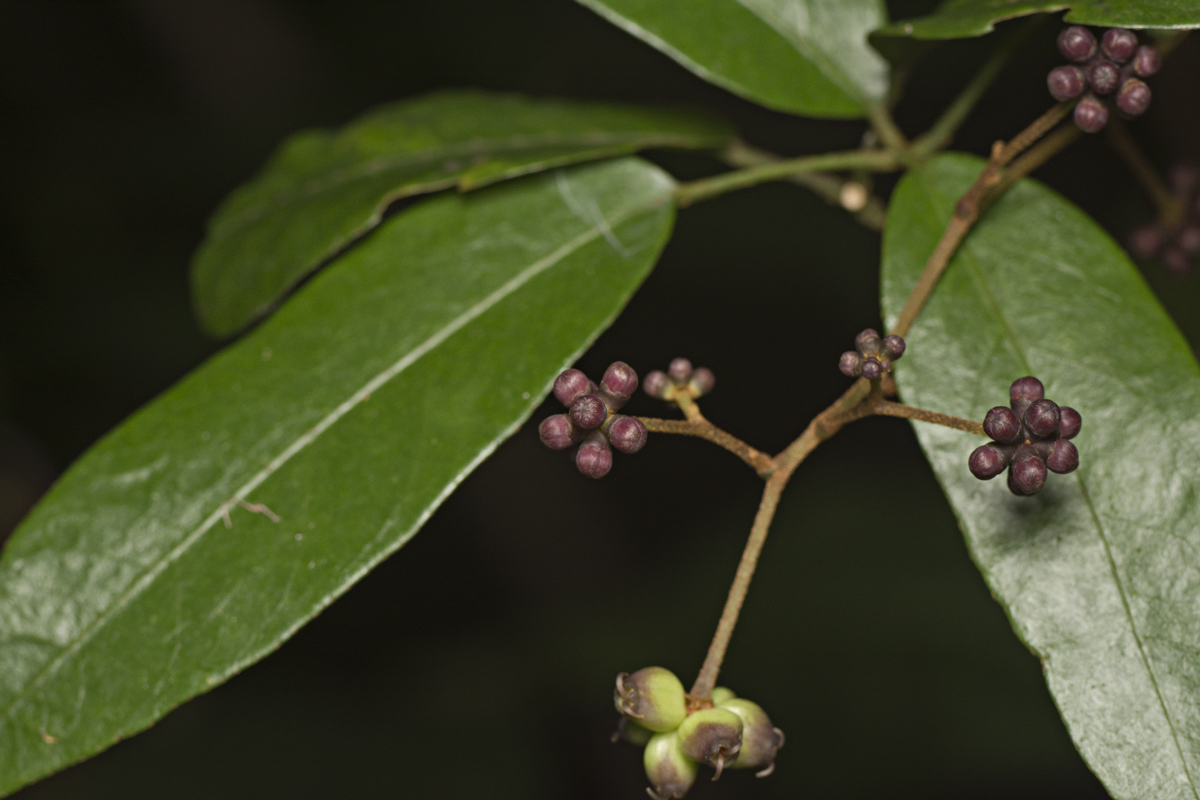

Scientific classification
- Kingdom: Plantae
- Clade: Tracheophytes
- Clade: Angiosperms
- Clade: Eudicots
- Clade: Asterids
- Order: Apiales
- Family: Araliaceae
- Subfamily: Aralioideae
- Genus: Cephalaralia; Harms
- Species: C. cephalobotrys

Binomial name
- Cephalaralia cephalobotrys (F.Muell.) Harms

Synonyms
- List: Aralia cephalobotrys (F.Muell.) Harms; Nothopanax cephalobotrys (F.Muell.) Seem.; Panax cephalobotrys F.Muell.

= Cephalaralia =

Genus of flowering plants

Cephalaralia is a genus of epiphytic vines of the family Araliaceae, endemic to Australia. It is monotypic, being represented by the single species Cephalaralia cephalobotrys.
