= Harmsiopanax =

Scientific classification
- Kingdom: Plantae
- Clade: Tracheophytes
- Clade: Angiosperms
- Clade: Eudicots
- Clade: Asterids
- Order: Apiales
- Family: Araliaceae
- Subfamily: Aralioideae
- Genus: Harmsiopanax; Warb.

Species
- Harmsiopanax aculeata; Harmsiopanax harmsii; Harmsiopanax ingens

Synonyms
- Horsfieldia Blume ex DC.

Genus of flowering plants

Harmsiopanax is a genus of woody, monocarpic flowering plants of a palmlike habit belonging to the family Araliaceae. It comprises 3 species, of which the most important is the gigantic Harmsiopanax ingens.

The genus name of Harmsiopanax is in honour of Hermann Harms (1870–1942), a German taxonomist and botanist. It was first described and published in H.G.A.Engler & K.A.E.Prantl, Nat. Pflanzenfam., Nachtr. Vol.1 on page 166 in 1897.

The genus is native to Java, the Lesser Sunda Islands, New Guinea and Sulawesi.

== Other sources ==
- Philipson W.R., "A revision of Harmsiopanax (Araliaceae)", Blumea 21 (1973) 81-86.
