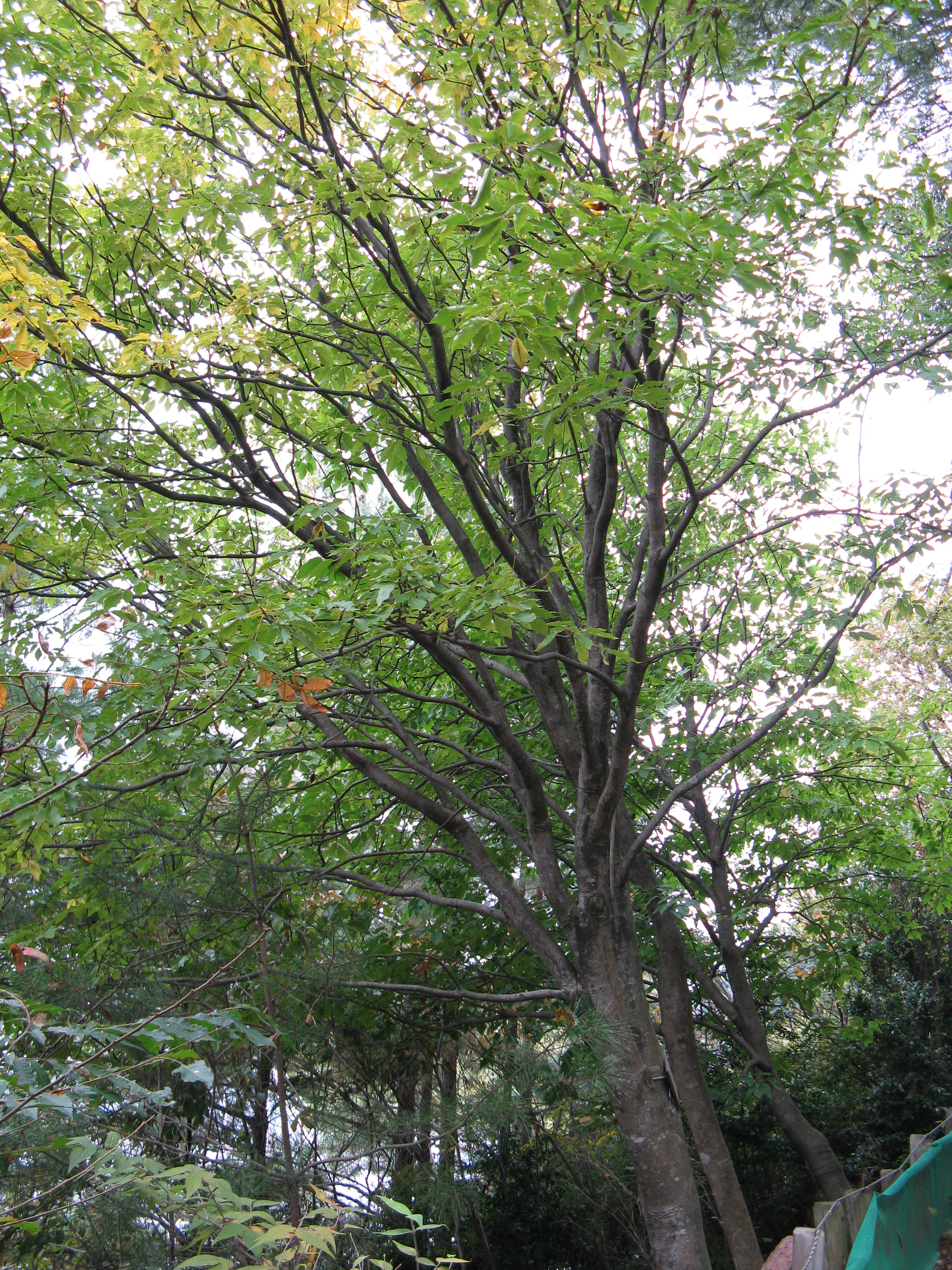
- Gamblea innovans

Scientific classification
- Kingdom: Plantae
- Clade: Tracheophytes
- Clade: Angiosperms
- Clade: Eudicots
- Clade: Asterids
- Order: Apiales
- Family: Araliaceae
- Subfamily: Aralioideae
- Genus: Gamblea; C.B.Clarke

Synonyms
- Evodiopanax (Harms) Nakai

= Gamblea =

Genus of flowering plants

Gamblea is a genus of plants of the family Araliaceae, comprising four species. It originally comprised a single species, Gamblea ciliata, which is found in India.

The genus's native range stretches from the Himalaya to Japan and Sumatera. It is found in Assam (part of India), China, East Himalaya, Japan, Laos, Malaya, Myanmar, Nepal, Sumatera, Tibet and Vietnam.

The genus name of Gamblea is in honour of James Sykes Gamble (1847–1925), an English botanist who specialized in the flora of the Indian sub-continent. and it was first described and published in J.D.Hooker, Fl. Brit. India Vol.2 on page 739 in 1879.

== Known species ==
According to Kew;

- Gamblea ciliata C.B.Clarke
- Gamblea innovans (Siebold & Zucc.) C.B.Shang, Lowry & Frodin
- Gamblea malayana (M.R.Hend.) C.B.Shang, Lowry & Frodin
- Gamblea pseudoevodiaefolia (K.M.Feng) C.B.Shang, Lowry & Frodin
