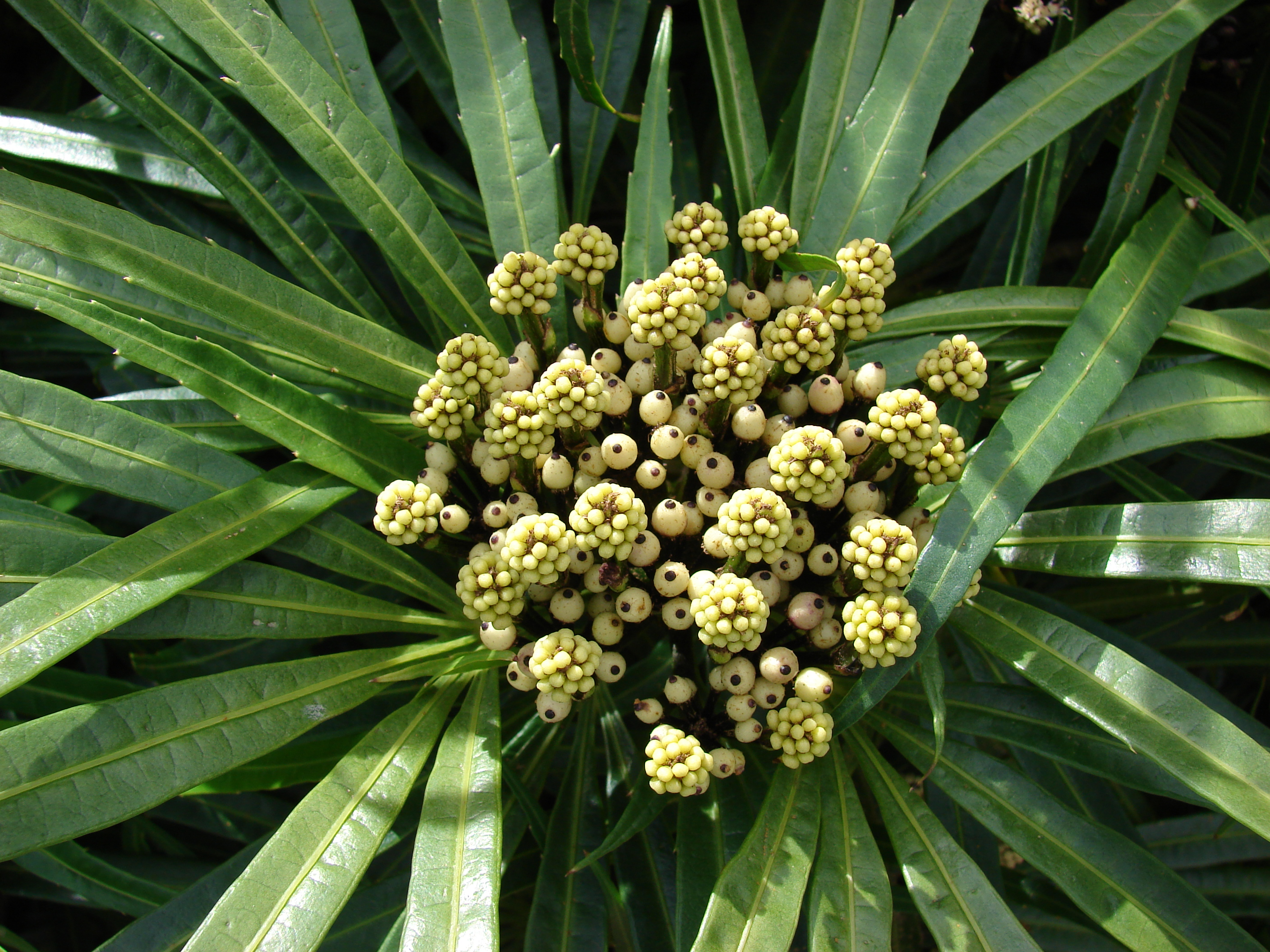
- Osmoxylon lineare

Scientific classification
- Kingdom: Plantae
- Clade: Tracheophytes
- Clade: Angiosperms
- Clade: Eudicots
- Clade: Asterids
- Order: Apiales
- Family: Araliaceae
- Subfamily: Aralioideae
- Genus: Osmoxylon; Miq.

Species
- see text

Synonyms
- Boerlagiodendron Harms; Eschweileria Zipp. ex Boerl.; Pseudosantalum Rumph. ex Kuntze

= Osmoxylon =

Genus of flowering plants

Osmoxylon is a genus of flowering plants in the family Araliaceae.

== Species ==
As of September 2025, Plants of the World Online accepts the following 61 species:

- Osmoxylon arrhenicum B.J.Conn & Frodin
- Osmoxylon articulatum Philipson
- Osmoxylon barbatum Becc.
- Osmoxylon boerlagei (Warb.) Philipson
- Osmoxylon borneense Seem.
- Osmoxylon camiguinense (Merr.) Philipson
- Osmoxylon catanduanense (Merr.) Philipson
- Osmoxylon caudatum (Merr.) Philipson
- Osmoxylon celebicum Philipson
- Osmoxylon chrysanthum B.J.Conn & Frodin
- Osmoxylon confertiflorum B.J.Conn & Frodin
- Osmoxylon corneri B.J.Conn & Frodin
- Osmoxylon dinagatense (Merr.) Philipson
- Osmoxylon ellipsoideum B.J.Conn & Frodin
- Osmoxylon eminens (W.Bull) Philipson
- Osmoxylon fenicis (Merr.) Philipson
- Osmoxylon geelvinkianum Becc.
- Osmoxylon globulare Philipson
- Osmoxylon heterophyllum (Merr.) Philipson
- Osmoxylon humile (Elmer) Philipson
- Osmoxylon insidiator Becc.
- Osmoxylon insigne (Miq.) Becc.
- Osmoxylon kostermansii Philipson
- Osmoxylon lanceolatum Philipson
- Osmoxylon leidichii Costion
- Osmoxylon lineare (Merr.) Philipson
- Osmoxylon luzoniense (Merr.) Philipson
- Osmoxylon mariannense (Kaneh.) Fosberg & Sachet
- Osmoxylon masarangense Philipson
- Osmoxylon micranthum (Harms) Philipson
- Osmoxylon miquelii Boerl.
- Osmoxylon ngardokense Costion
- Osmoxylon novoguineense (Scheff.) Becc.
- Osmoxylon oblongifolium Philipson
- Osmoxylon orientale (Guillaumin) B.C.Stone
- Osmoxylon pachyphyllum (Kaneh.) Fosberg & Sachet
- Osmoxylon palmatum (Lam.) Philipson
- Osmoxylon pectinatum (Merr.) Philipson
- Osmoxylon pfeilii (Warb.) Philipson
- Osmoxylon pseudofoliatum B.J.Conn & Frodin
- Osmoxylon pulcherrimum S.Vidal ex Fern.-Vill.
- Osmoxylon puniceopolleniferum (B.C.Stone) B.C.Stone
- Osmoxylon ramosii (Merr.) Philipson
- Osmoxylon reburrum (B.C.Stone) B.C.Stone
- Osmoxylon rectibrachiatum B.J.Conn & Frodin
- Osmoxylon russellense (Philipson) B.C.Stone
- Osmoxylon serratifolium (Elmer) Philipson
- Osmoxylon sessiliflorum (Lauterb. ex Harms) Philipson
- Osmoxylon simplicifolium (Elmer) Philipson
- Osmoxylon soelaense Philipson
- Osmoxylon spathipedunculatum (Philipson) Philipson
- Osmoxylon striatifructum B.J.Conn & Frodin
- Osmoxylon superantiflorum B.J.Conn & Frodin
- Osmoxylon talaudense Philipson
- Osmoxylon tetrandrum (C.T.White) B.C.Stone
- Osmoxylon teysmannii (Boerl.) Philipson
- Osmoxylon trilobatum (Merr.) Philipson
- Osmoxylon truncatum (Kaneh.) Fosberg & Sachet
- Osmoxylon umbelliferum (Lam.) Merr.
- Osmoxylon whitmorei B.J.Conn & Frodin
- Osmoxylon yatesii (Merr.) Philipson
