= Merrilliopanax =

Scientific classification
- Kingdom: Plantae
- Clade: Tracheophytes
- Clade: Angiosperms
- Clade: Eudicots
- Clade: Asterids
- Order: Apiales
- Family: Araliaceae
- Subfamily: Aralioideae
- Genus: Merrilliopanax; H.L.Li

Species
- Merrilliopanax alpinus; Merrilliopanax listeri; Merrilliopanax membranifolius

Genus of plants

Merrilliopanax is a genus of flowering plants in the family Araliaceae, comprising 3 species of the subgenus Airampora. They are found in western China, Myanmar, northeast India, Bhutan, and Nepal.

The genus name of Merrilliopanax is in honour of Elmer Drew Merrill (1876–1956), an American botanist and taxonomist, and also panax meaning "all-healing" in Greek. The genus was first described and published in Sargentia Vol.2 on page 62 in 1942.
