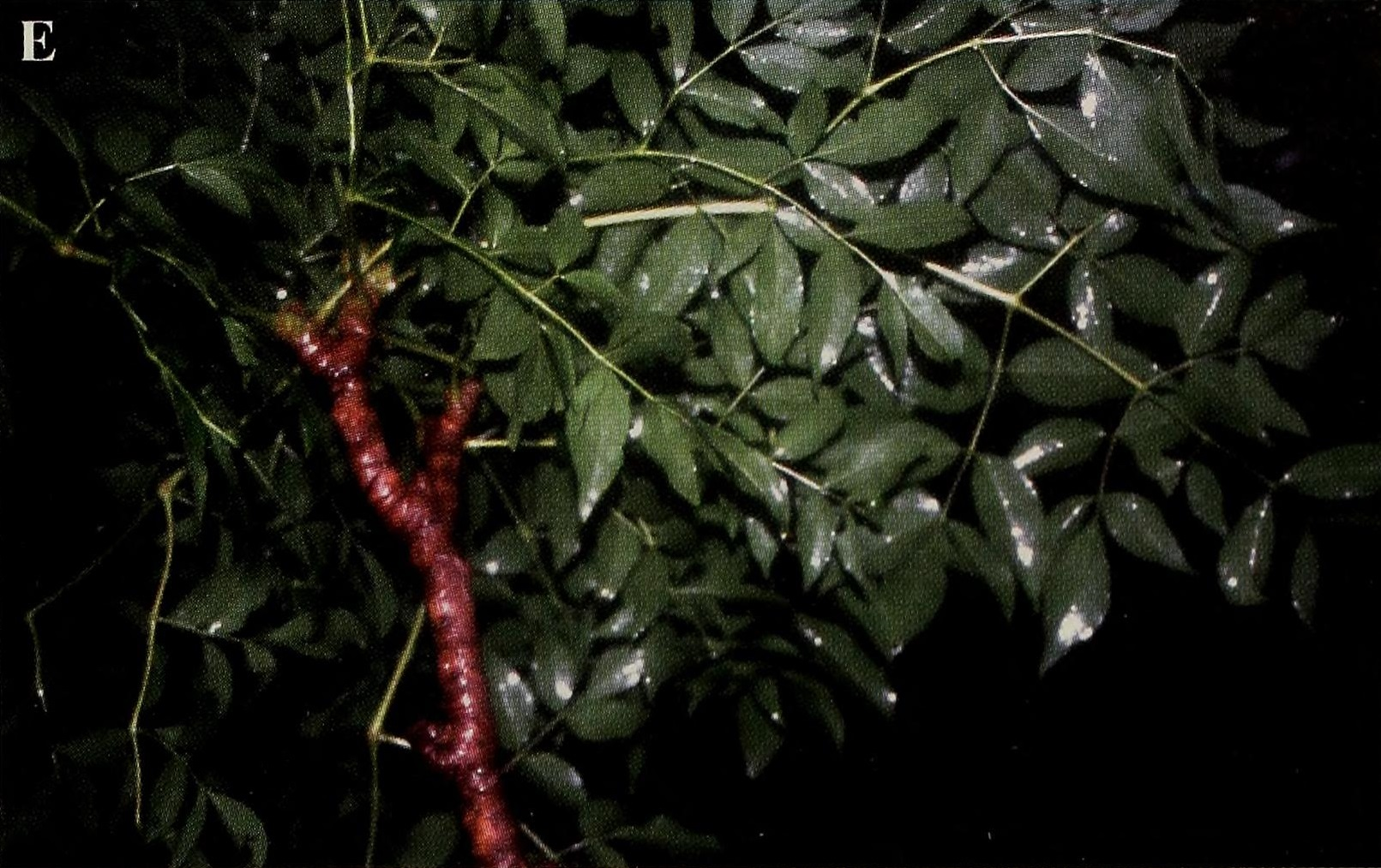

Conservation status
- Least Concern (IUCN 3.1)

Scientific classification
- Kingdom: Plantae
- Clade: Tracheophytes
- Clade: Angiosperms
- Clade: Eudicots
- Clade: Asterids
- Order: Apiales
- Family: Araliaceae
- Genus: Aralia
- Species: A. excelsa

Binomial name
- Aralia excelsa (Griseb.) J.Wen

Synonyms
- Sciadodendron excelsum Griseb.; Pentapanax granatensis Rusby; Reynoldsia americana Donn.Sm.

= Aralia excelsa =

Species of flowering plant

Aralia excelsa is a species of flowering plant in the family Araliaceae. It is native to Mexico, Central America, northern South America and parts of the Caribbean.

This species is a shrub or tree up to 20 meters tall with tripinnate leaves and umbels of flowers.
