= Ficus uncinata =

Conservation status
- Least Concern (IUCN 3.1)

Scientific classification
- Kingdom: Plantae
- Clade: Tracheophytes
- Clade: Angiosperms
- Clade: Eudicots
- Clade: Rosids
- Order: Rosales
- Family: Moraceae
- Genus: Ficus
- Species: F. uncinata

Binomial name
- Ficus uncinata (King) Becc.

Synonyms
- Ficus geocarpa var. uncinata King; Ficus uncinata var. gracilis Corner; Ficus uncinata var. pilosior Corner

Species of flowering plant

Ficus uncinata, also known as earth fig in English and as ara entimau in Iban, is a species of flowering plant, a fruit tree in the fig family, that is native to Borneo in Southeast Asia.

== Description ==
The species grows as a shrub or small tree to 8 m in height, with a bole of up to 2 m (6 ft 7 in) in height and a DBH of not over 15 cm (6 in), from which stolons (which constitute an inflorescence and are sometimes called "stolon-panicles") extend along the ground surface for up to 10 m (33 ft). The hairy, greenish-brown leaves are 21–27 cm (8.3–10.6 in) long by 10–11 cm (3.9–4.3 in) wide. The inflorescences occur along the stolons. The pink, red or brownish-purple pyriform (pear-shaped) or globose fruits are 2–4 cm (0.79–1.57 in) in diameter, and are covered by spine-like bracts.

The ground-level figs are eaten and the seeds dispersed by pigs, deer, ground squirrels and rats. The function of the bracts is to prevent the fruits being swallowed whole by ground-level seed predators, such as pheasants and partridges.

== Distribution and habitat ==
The species is found in Borneo and possibly in Sumatra. It grows in primary and secondary lowland rain forest along streams and in hill areas and mountain forest up to an elevation of 2,000 m (6,560 ft).
