= Frodinia =

Scientific classification
- Kingdom: Plantae
- Clade: Embryophytes
- Clade: Tracheophytes
- Clade: Angiosperms
- Clade: Eudicots
- Clade: Asterids
- Clade: Campanulids
- Order: Apiales
- Family: Araliaceae
- Genus: Frodinia; Lowry & G.M.Plunkett (2021)

Species
- Frodinia gleasonii (Britton & P.Wilson) Lowry & G.M.Plunkett; Frodinia tremula (Krug & Urb.) Lowry & G.M.Plunkett

Genus of flowering plants

Frodinia is a genus of plants in the family Araliaceae. Its species were formerly classed in Schefflera. It contains two species:

- Frodinia gleasonii (Britton & P.Wilson) Lowry & G.M.Plunkett – endemic to Puerto Rico
- Frodinia tremula (Krug & Urb.) Lowry & G.M.Plunkett – endemic to Hispaniola
