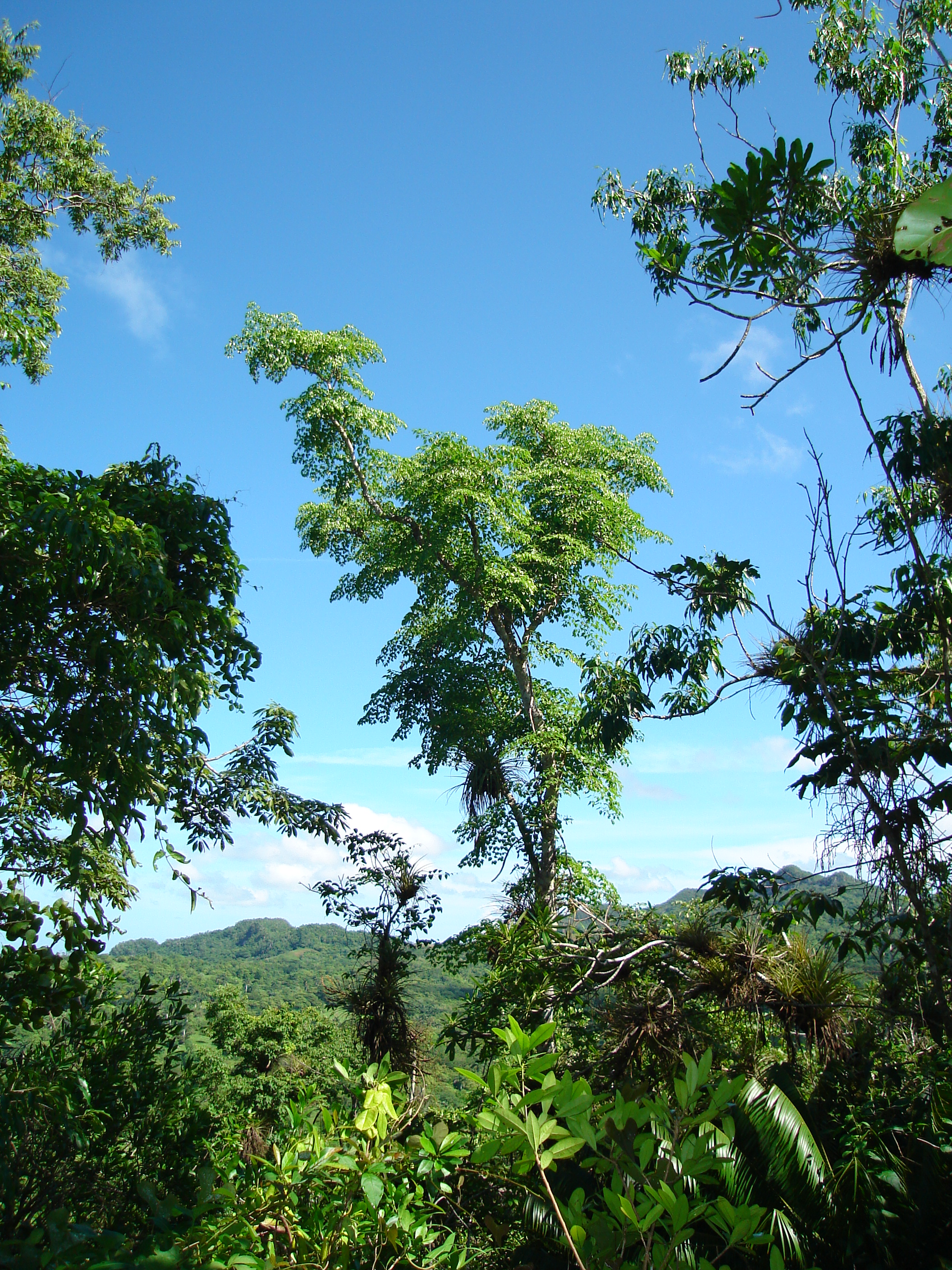
- In Parque Nacional Viñales, Pinar del Río, Cuba

Conservation status
- Critically Endangered (IUCN 3.1)

Scientific classification
- Kingdom: Plantae
- Clade: Tracheophytes
- Clade: Angiosperms
- Clade: Eudicots
- Clade: Asterids
- Order: Apiales
- Family: Araliaceae
- Genus: Aralia
- Species: A. rex

Binomial name
- Aralia rex (Ekman) J.Wen

Synonyms
- Megalopanax rex Ekman

= Aralia rex =

Species of flowering plant

Aralia rex is a species of flowering plant in the family Araliaceae. It has also been treated as Megalopanax rex, the only species in the genus Megalopanax. It is endemic to Cuba.
