= Berthold Carl Seemann =

German botanist (1825–1871)

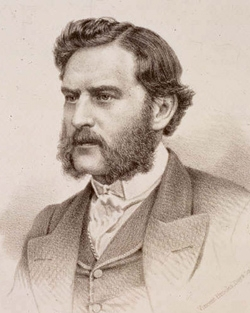
- Born: 25 February 1825
- Died: 10 October 1871 (aged 46)

Berthold Carl Seemann (25 February 1825, in Kingdom of Hanover – 10 October 1871, in Nicaragua) was a German botanist. He travelled widely and collected and described plants from the Pacific and South America. Along with his brother, he founded the German botanical periodical Bonplandia in 1853 and edited it for a decade before it became the Journal of Botany. The genus Seemannaralia is named after him.

== Life and work ==
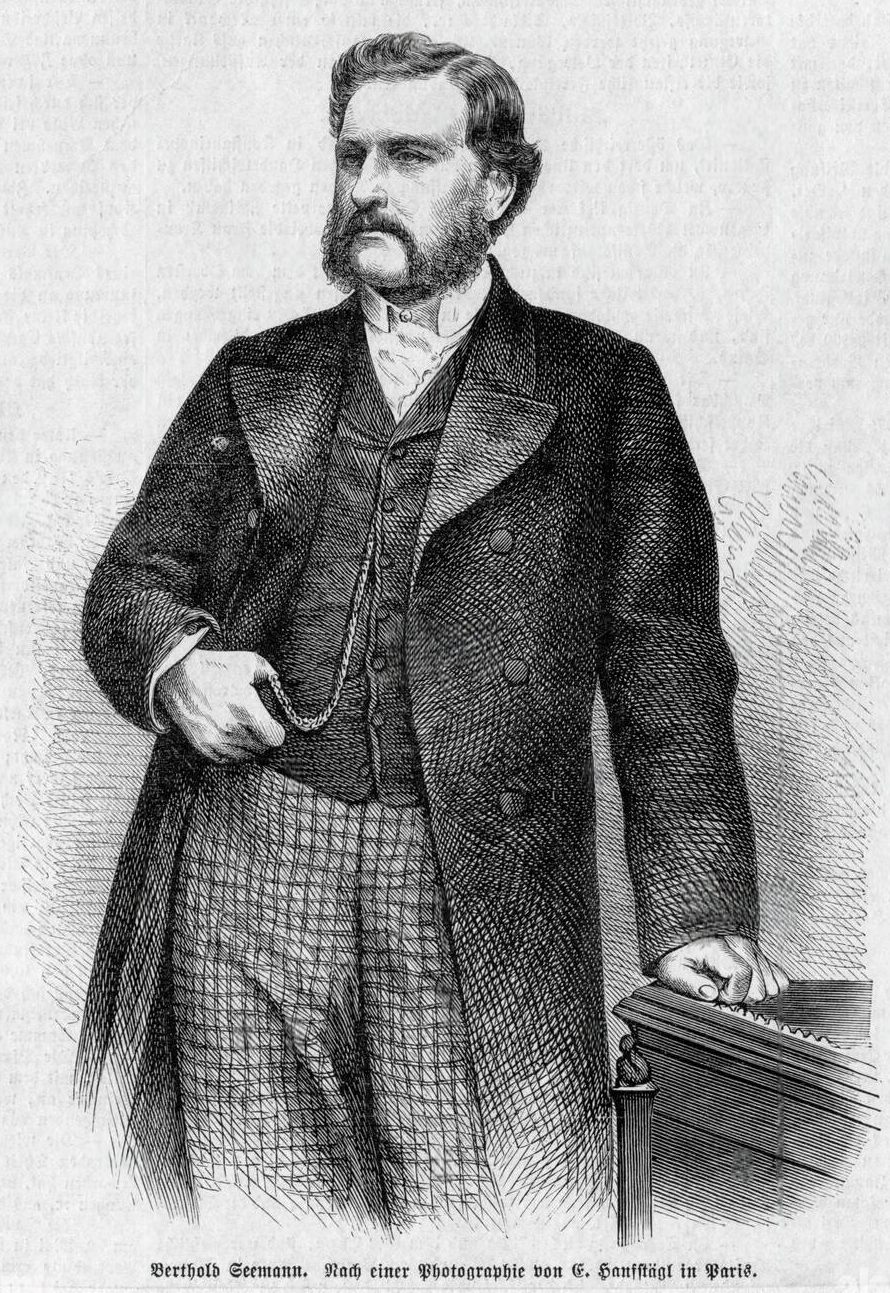

Seemann was born in Hanover and was educated at the Lycaeum in Hanover where Georg Friedrich Grotefend was once a headmaster. Grotefend's son was a teacher who introduced botany to Seemann. In 1844 Seemann travelled to the United Kingdom to study gardening and botany at the Royal Botanic Gardens, Kew, under John Smith. On the recommendation of Sir WJ Hooker, he was appointed naturalist on the voyage of exploration of the American west coast and Pacific by Henry Kellett on HMS Herald, 1847–1851, along with the naturalists Thomas Edmondston, and John Goodridge. The expedition returned via Hawaii, Hong Kong and the East Indies, calling at the Cape in March 1851. Here he met up with his old acquaintance Zeyher, and with Baur and Juritz they climbed Table Mountain on 13 March 1851, Ecklon being unwell and unable to accompany them. On 16 March Zeyher introduced him to Bowie at Wynberg. He left the Cape on 27 March and was back in England on 6 June 1851. The botanical results of the voyage were published as Botany of the Voyage of HMS Herald and he was awarded a Ph.D. by the University of Göttingen in 1853.

In 1859 he travelled to Fiji. Based on his travels he wrote Viti: An Account of a Government Mission to the Vitian or Fijian Islands in the Years 1860-1, and a botanical catalogue of the flora of the islands, entitled Flora Vitiensis: a description of the plants of the Viti or Fiji Islands with an account of their history and properties. This was published in 10 parts between 1865 and 1873. In this work, Seeman named and described 204 of the 297 currently identified plant species. It was the foundation for Flora Vitiensis Nova, published by Albert C. Smith from 1979 to 1991. In the 1860s he visited South America, travelling in Venezuela in 1864 on behalf of a Dutch firm and Nicaragua from 1866 to 1867. He managed a sugar estate in Panama and then the Javali gold mine in Nicaragua, where he finally succumbed to malaria.

He started and edited the journal Bonplandia from 1853–1862 and the Journal of Botany, British and Foreign from 1863–1871. His botanist brother Wilhelm Seemann co-edited Bonplandia.

Seemann became a specialist on the family now called Araliaceae with his series on the "Revision of the natural order Hederaceae". They appeared in the Journal of Botany, British and Foreign from 1864 to 1868. In 1868, Seemann published a book by the same title. It contained some original material, as well as reprints of the articles. It was the definitive work on Araliaceae until Hermann Harms published his monograph on the family in Die Natürlichen Pflanzenfamilien in 1898.

Specimens collected by Seemann are cared for at multiple institutions worldwide, including the Natural History Museum, London and the National Herbarium of Victoria, Royal Botanic Gardens Victoria.

The plant genus Seemannia Regel. (Gesneriaceae), Seemannantha Alef. and Seemannaralia R. Viguier (Araliaceae) were named in his honour. In addition to botany he composed music and wrote three German plays. He was a Fellow of the Linnean Society and of the Royal Geographical Society.
