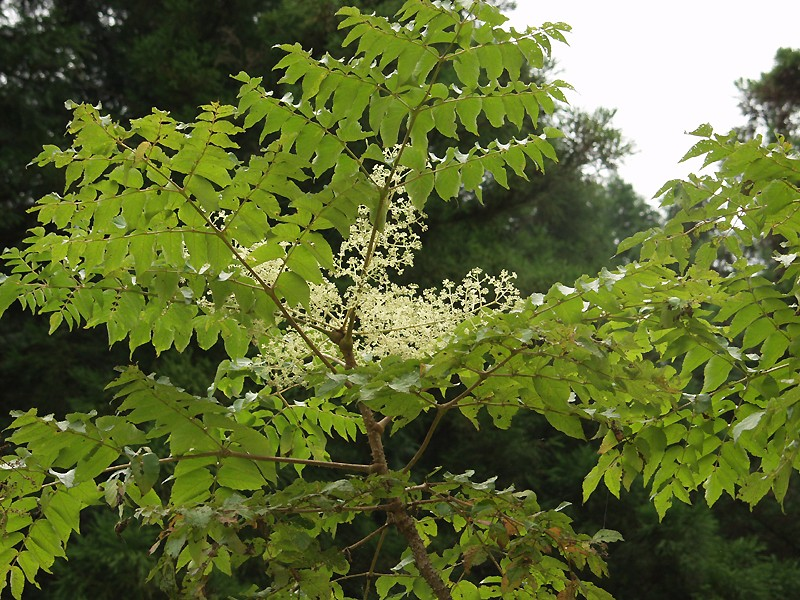
- Aralia elata

Scientific classification
- Kingdom: Plantae
- Clade: Embryophytes
- Clade: Tracheophytes
- Clade: Angiosperms
- Clade: Eudicots
- Clade: Asterids
- Order: Apiales
- Family: Araliaceae; Juss.

Subfamilies and genera
- See text

Synonyms
- Botryodendraceae J.Agardh; Hydrocotylaceae (Drude) Hyl., nom. cons.

= Araliaceae =

Araliaceae Temporal range: Eocene–present

Family of flowering plants

The Araliaceae are a family of flowering plants composed of about 47 genera and around 1500 species. They are primarily woody plants, along with some herbaceous plants commonly referred to as the ivy or ginseng family. The morphology of Araliaceae varies widely. It is predominantly distinguishable based on its woody habit, tropical distribution, and the presence of simple umbels.

There are numerous plants of economic importance amongst the Araliaceae family. Some genera, including Hedera (the ivies), Fatsia (Japanese aralias) and Heptapleurum (formerly Schefflera, the umbrella trees), are used as ornamental foliage plants. The Araliaceae family also includes Panax ginseng, the root of which is ginseng, used in traditional Chinese medicine.

== Overview ==
The morphology of Araliaceae varies widely. Many studies have found that there is no unifying characteristic capable of classifying the family. In general, Araliaceae species have large, usually alternate leaves, often with aromatic ethereal oils, five-petaled flowers, two to five carpels, simple umbels, and berries without carpophores or oil cavities. Some taxa carry prickles, and the family is often woody but also occasionally herbaceous. While Araliaceae is predominantly a tropical family, some taxa are also endemic to temperate climates. They are found in the Americas, Eurasia, Africa, Australia, New Zealand, New Caledonia, and Pacific islands.

Some examples of Araliaceae include the angelica tree (Aralia spinosa), the devil's club (Oplopanax horridus), ivy (Hedera spp., including H. helix), and herbs such as ginseng (Panax spp.). Leaves are sometimes lauroid (resembling Laurus) and are simple to compound; when compound, they are ternate, pinnate, or palmate.

Araliaceae are found in the pluvial montane forest, very humid montane forest, and humid lowland river forest regions. They are also present in laurel forest, cloud forest, and warm, humid habitats.

== Taxonomy and systematics ==
Araliaceae is one of six angiosperm families recognized by APG IV belonging to the Apiales, an order within the Asterids. Araliaceae is accepted to be a monophyletic branch within the Apiales.

Within Araliaceae, there are four accepted groups:

1. The Greater Raukaua group, sister to the rest of the main Araliaceae clades.

2. The Aralia-Panax group, consisting of the mostly monophyletic genera Aralia and Panax.

3. The Polyscias-Pseudopanax group, sister to both genus Cussonia and the Asian Palmate group.

4. The Asian Palmate group, largest of the groups representing Araliaceae.

There are also multiple taxa that float around these groups, but are not within them.

The generic level classification of the Araliaceae has been unstable and remains under study. For instance, numerous genera have been synonymized under Schefflera, within which about half the species within Araliaceae are placed. Recent molecular phylogenies have shown that this large pantropical genus is polyphyletic and some believe it should be divided again into several genera, though these would probably not correspond with the previously recognized genera.

Recent molecular systematics techniques have made major improvements into understanding of the evolution of Araliaceae, leading to the knowledge existing today. Due to widely varying morphological characters, the systematics of Araliaceae had been largely debated over the past century, especially in the absence of molecular evidence. For instance, Araliaceae were previously merged into the closely related Apiaceae (synonym: Umbelliferae) in some taxonomic treatments that have since been rejected. The family is closely related to the Apiaceae and Pittosporaceae, but some of the exact boundaries between Araliaceae and the other families of Apiales are still uncertain and are currently being examined.

One example group that proved problematic for Araliaceae systematics is subfamily Hydrocotyloideae. Molecular phylogenies suggest at least some of the genera traditionally spanning across Araliaceae and Apiaceae as Hydrocotyloideae appear to be more closely related to Araliaceae. It has been recommended that subfamily Hydrocotyloideae be narrowed to just include genera Hydrocotyle, Trachymene, and Harmsiopanax to form a monophyletic group in Araliaceae.

== Subfamilies and genera ==
Subfamily Aralioideae

- Anakasia
- Aralia
- Astropanax
- Astrotricha
- Brassaiopsis
- Cephalaralia
- Cephalopanax
- Cheirodendron
- Chengiopanax
- Crepinella
- Cussonia
- Dendropanax
- Didymopanax
- Eleutherococcus
- × Fatshedera
- Fatsia
- Frodinia
- Gamblea
- Harmsiopanax
- Hedera
- Heptapleurum
- Heteropanax
- Kalopanax
- Macropanax
- Megalopanax
- Merrilliopanax
- Meryta
- Metapanax
- Motherwellia
- Neocussonia
- Neopanax
- Oplopanax
- Oreopanax
- Osmoxylon
- Panax
- †Paleopanax
- Plerandra
- Polyscias (includes former genera Arthrophyllum, Cuphocarpus as subgenera)
- Pseudopanax
- Raukaua
- Schefflera
- Sciadodendron
- Sciodaphyllum
- Seemannaralia
- Sinopanax
- Tetrapanax
- Trevesia
- Woodburnia

Subfamily Hydrocotyloideae

- Hydrocotyle
- Trachymene

Subfamily incertae sedis

- †Araliaceoipollenites (fossil pollen)
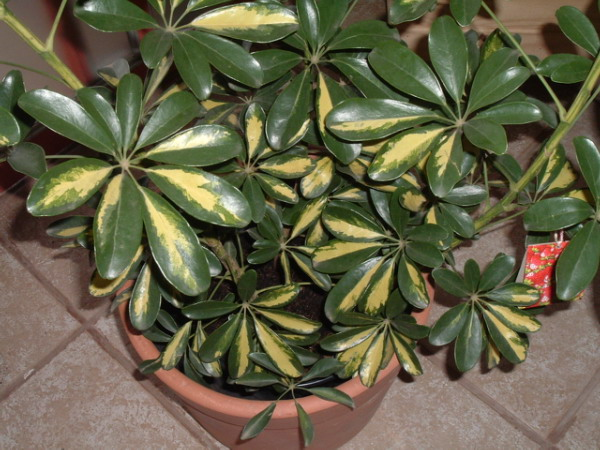
Heptapleurum arboricola

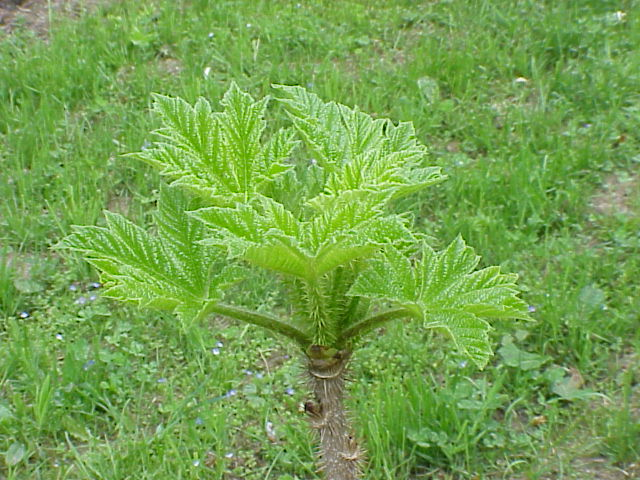
Oplopanax horridus

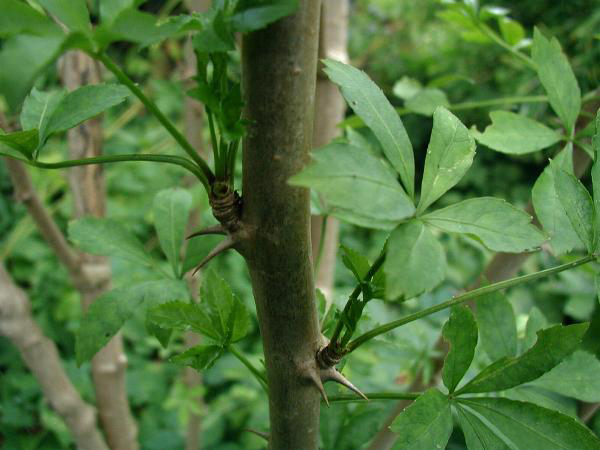
Eleutherococcus sieboldianus

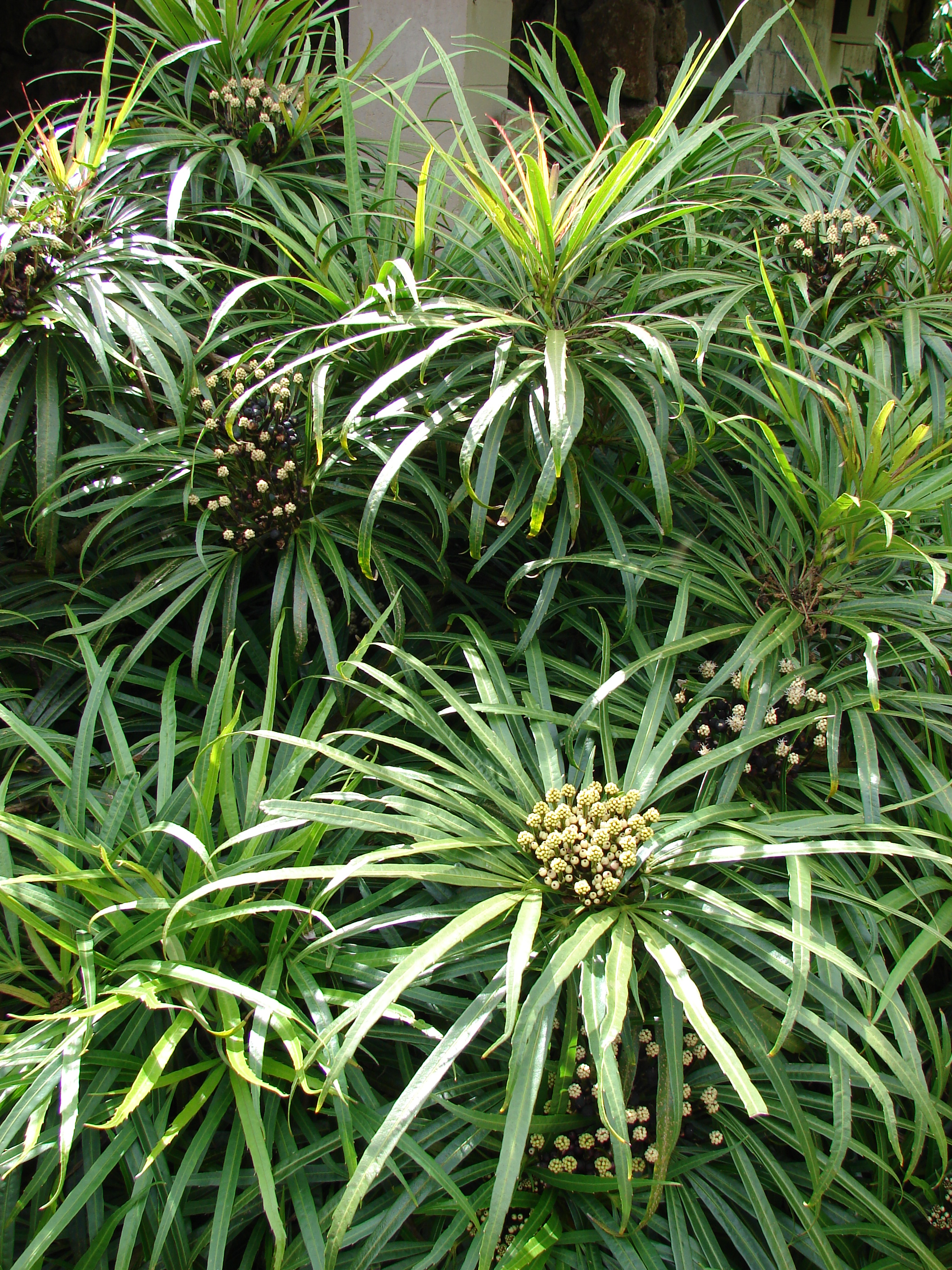
Osmoxylon lineare

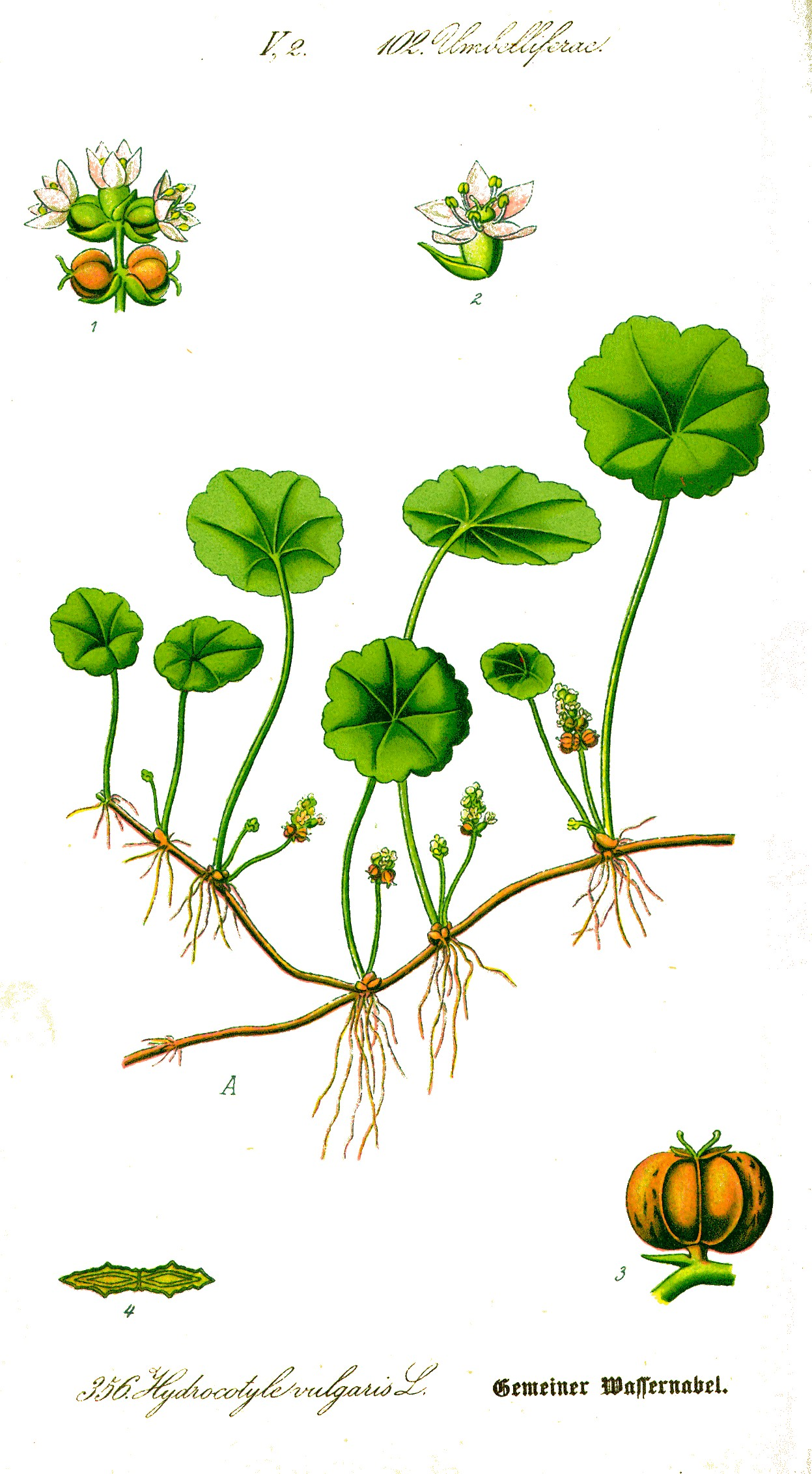
Hydrocotyle vulgaris

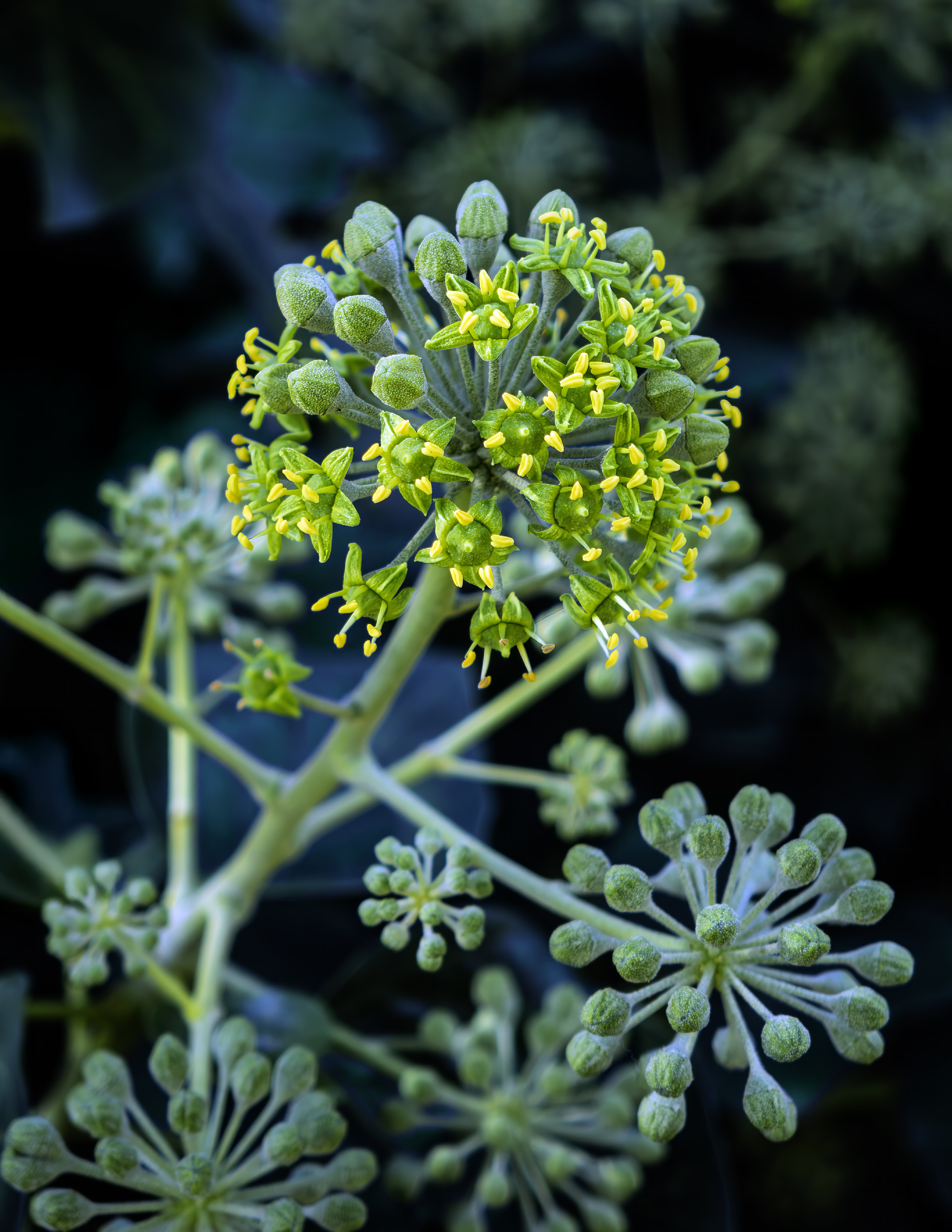
Hedera helix

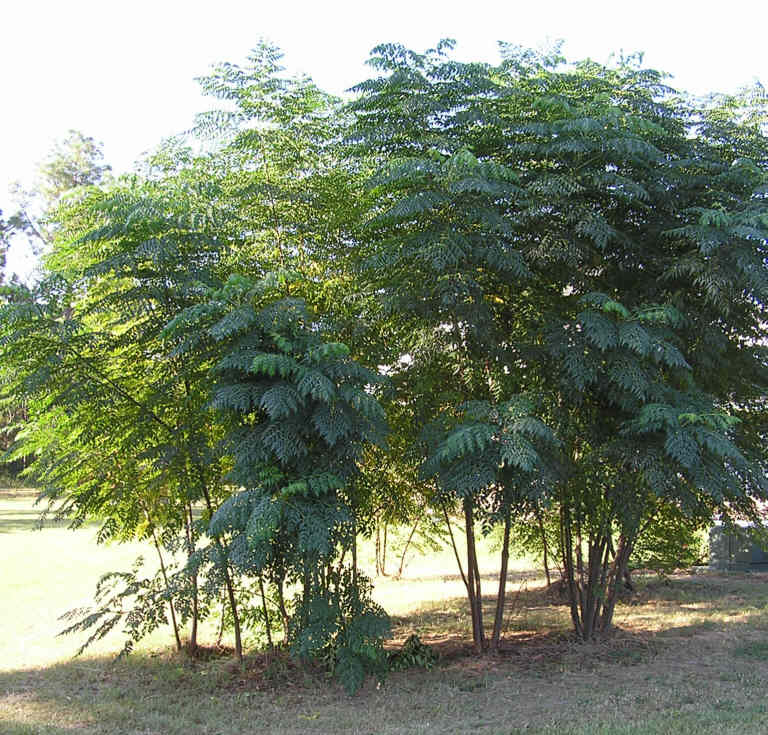
Aralia spinosa

== See also ==
- List of foliage plant diseases (Araliaceae)
