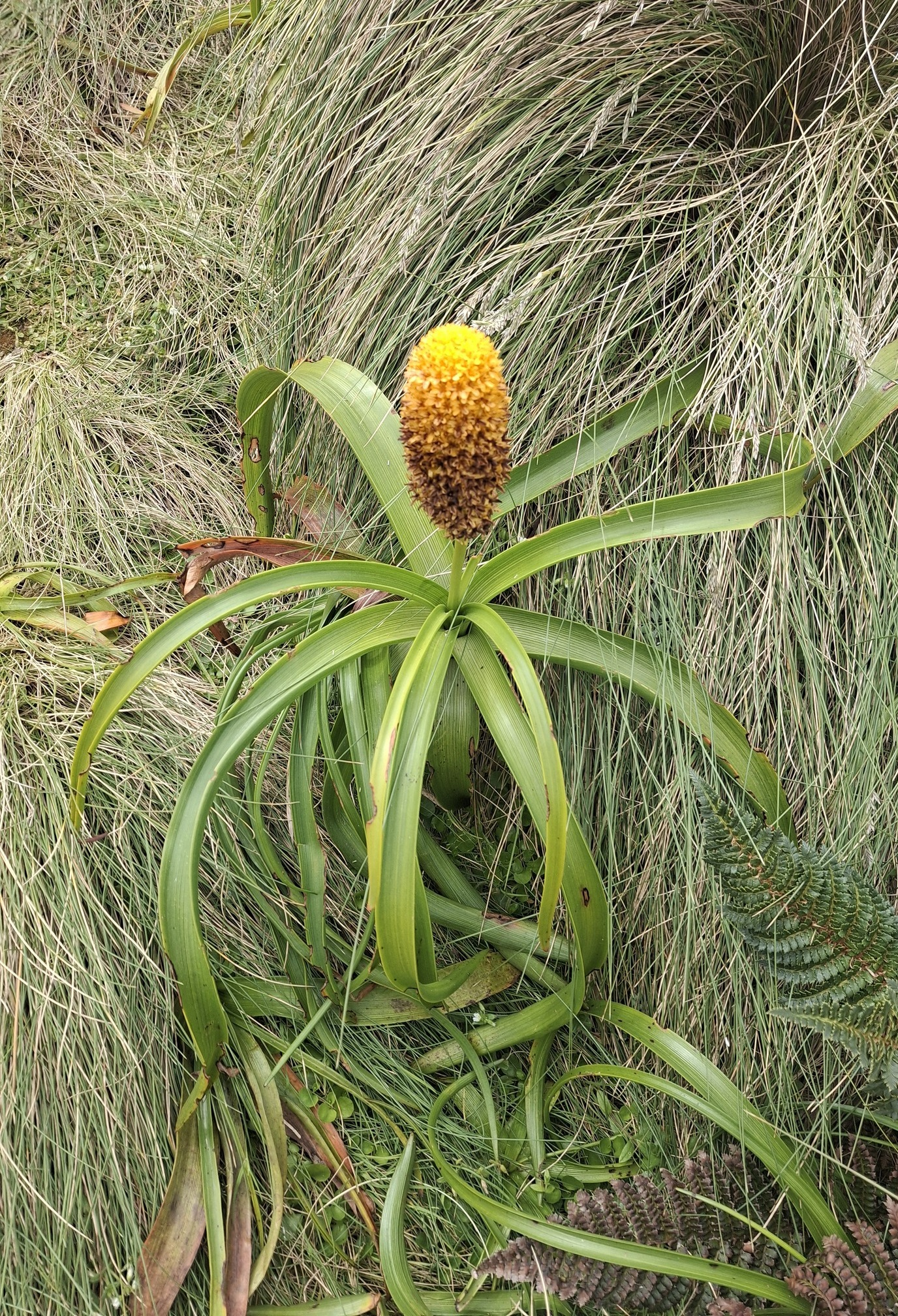
- Bulbinella rossii on Campbell Island

Conservation status
- Naturally Uncommon (NZ TCS)

Scientific classification
- Kingdom: Plantae
- Clade: Tracheophytes
- Clade: Angiosperms
- Clade: Monocots
- Order: Asparagales
- Family: Asphodelaceae
- Subfamily: Asphodeloideae
- Genus: Bulbinella
- Species: B. rossii

Binomial name
- Bulbinella rossii (Hook.f.) Cheeseman

Synonyms
- Chrysobactron rossii Hook.f.; Anthericum rossii (Hook.f.) Hook.f.

= Bulbinella rossii =

Species of flowering plant

Bulbinella rossii, commonly known as the Ross lily, is a species of flowering plant in the family Asphodelaceae. It is an endemic megaherb of New Zealand's subantarctic Auckland Islands and Campbell Island. It was first described in 1845 by Joseph Dalton Hooker in the Flora Antarctica, from material collected on Campbell Island, as Chrysobactron rossii.

Bulbinella rossii reaches a height of up to 1 metre (3 feet 3 inches). Its leaves are strap-like, dark-green in colour and are up to 0.6–1 metre (2 feet 0 inches – 3 feet 3 inches) long. Its inflorescences (flower clusters) have a cylindrical raceme up to 600 mm long, with densely crowded golden-yellow flowers. The roots of B. rossii are often eaten by introduced pigs, but the species is avoided by cattle, goats and sheep. B. rossii occurs from sea level to high-altitude areas and prefers colder habitats with high water content. B. rossii was evaluated in the 2024 assessment by the New Zealand Threat Classification System as "At Risk — Naturally Uncommon". B. rossii is featured on the reverse of the New Zealand five-dollar note.

== Description ==
Bulbinella rossii is a large and dioecious megaherb in the family Asphodelaceae and the subfamily Asphodeloideae. It reaches a height of up to 1 metre (3 feet 3 inches) in height with a basal diameter of 40 mm. The dark-green coloured, fleshy, smooth, strap-like leaves are 0.6–1 m long and 15–60 mm wide. The inflorescence (flower cluster) is a cylindrical raceme up to 600 mm long. The golden yellow flowers it produces are densely crowded, 10–14 mm in diameter. The ovoid (oval) seed capsules it produces are 10 mm long, containing narrowly winged, dark-brown coloured seeds. B. rossii flowers from October to January and fruits from December to March.

Bulbinella rossii's ovaries is left undeveloped in male specimens; in female specimens, its tepals spread approximately 11–12 mm in diameter more erect and remaining, becoming more firm in texture as its fruit ripens; in female specimens; the capsules are broadly ovoid and the seeds are 6 mm long. B. rossii's younger flower buds and freshly opened blooms which are more closely packed compared to older flowers, which could contribute to heat retention in the areas. A 2016 study, published in Polar Research, hypothesised that the warmth generated by inflorescences plays a role in attracting insects to its heated flowers, in the generally cold sub-Antarctic climate, where the average temperature is 6.88 °C (44.38 °F).

=== Phytochemistry ===
Species in the Bulbinella genus produce unique compounds called 'phenylanthraquinones', which are predominantly found in African species. However, Bulbinella species endemic to New Zealand also produce these compounds, especially B. rossii which contained unique sulphated phenylanthraquinones, including a glycoside-substituted compound called "40-O-demethylknipholone-40-β-D-xylopyranosyl-300-sulphate".

A high-performance liquid chromatography (HPLC) analysis of five New Zealand Bulbinella species revealed that all the species analysed contained phenylanthraquinones, with distinct profiles in leaves and roots. In their analysis, roots contained both sulphated and free phenylanthraquinones, while leaves primarily contained free knipholone.

=== Gallery ===
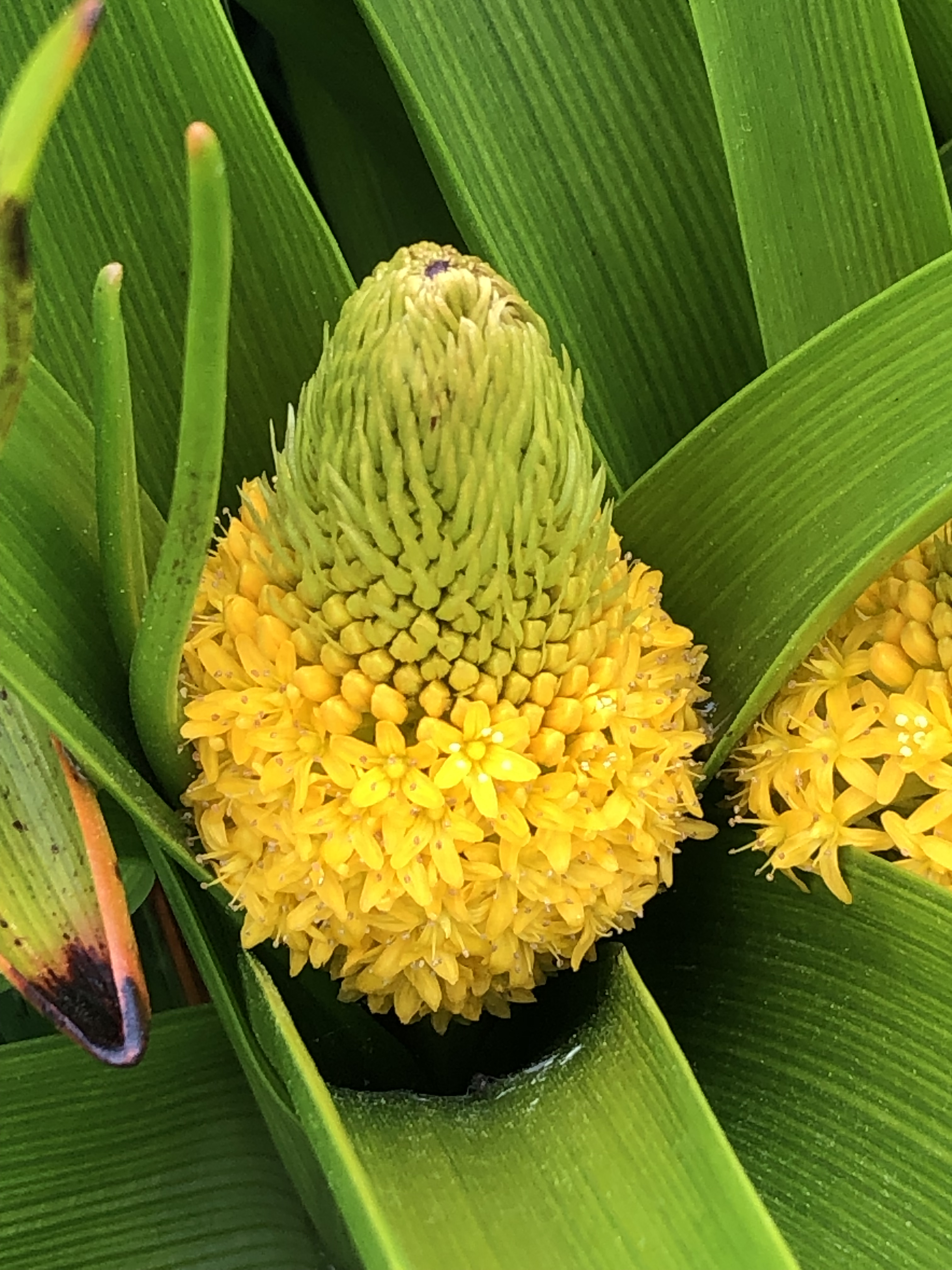

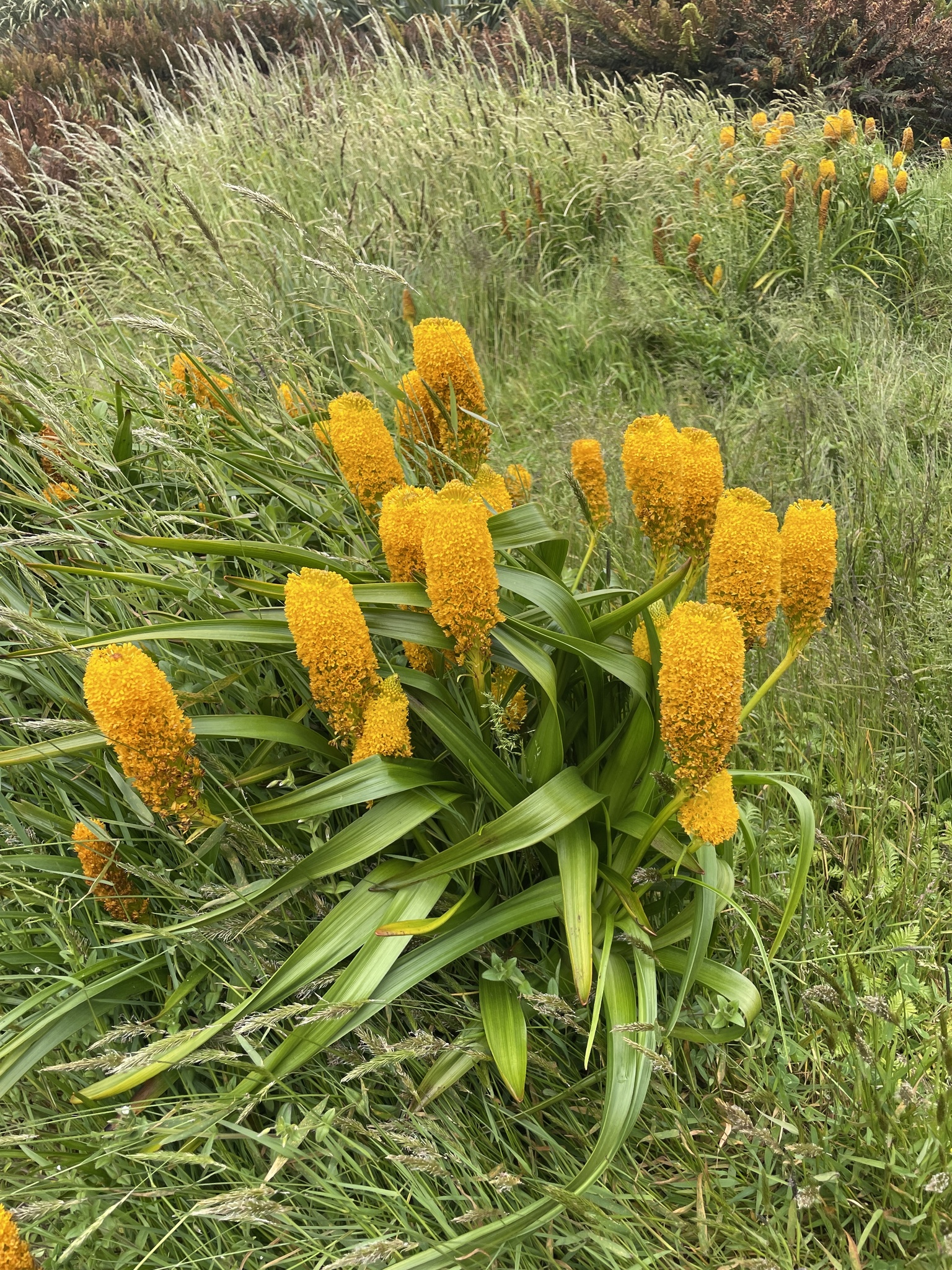

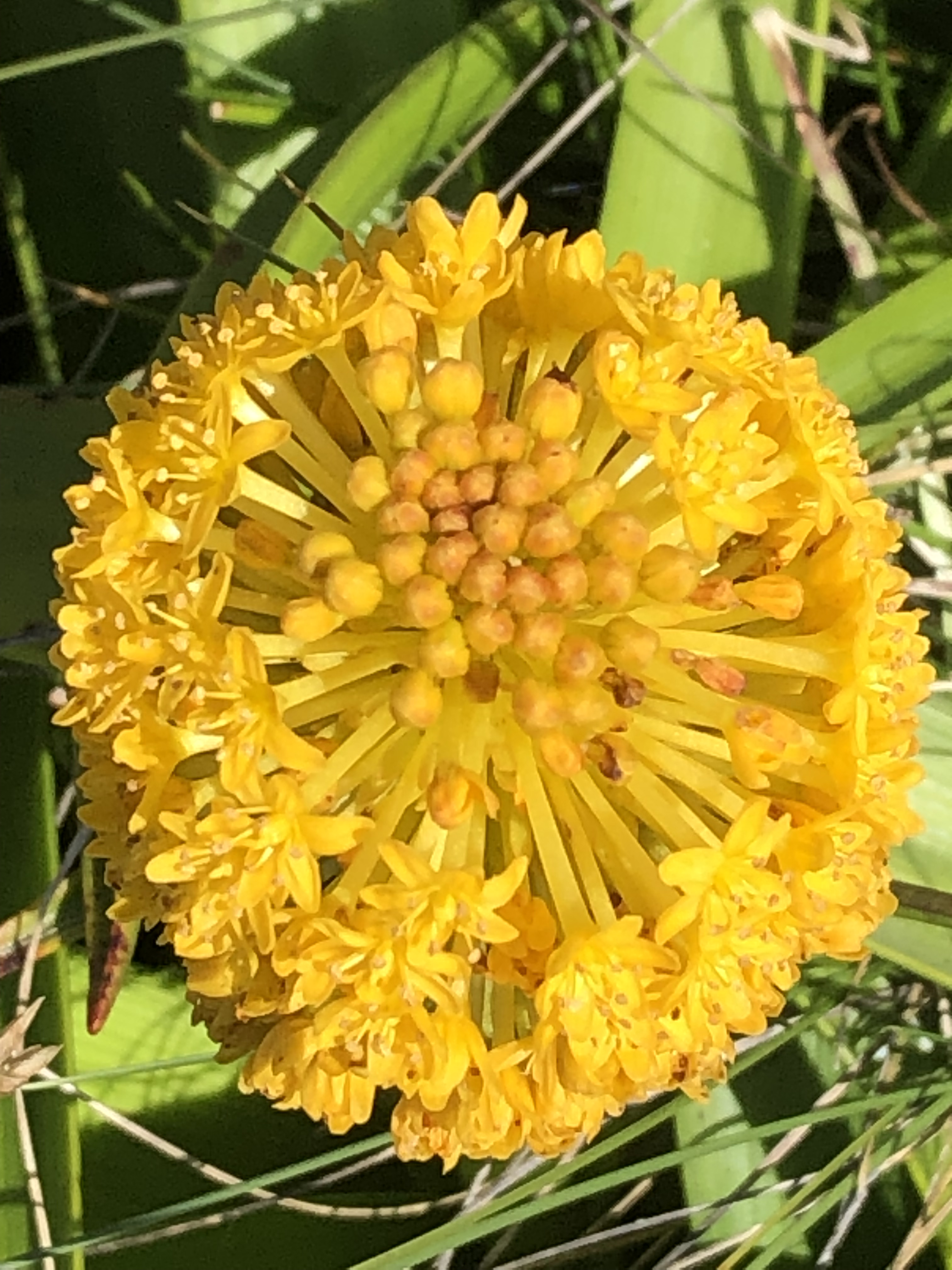

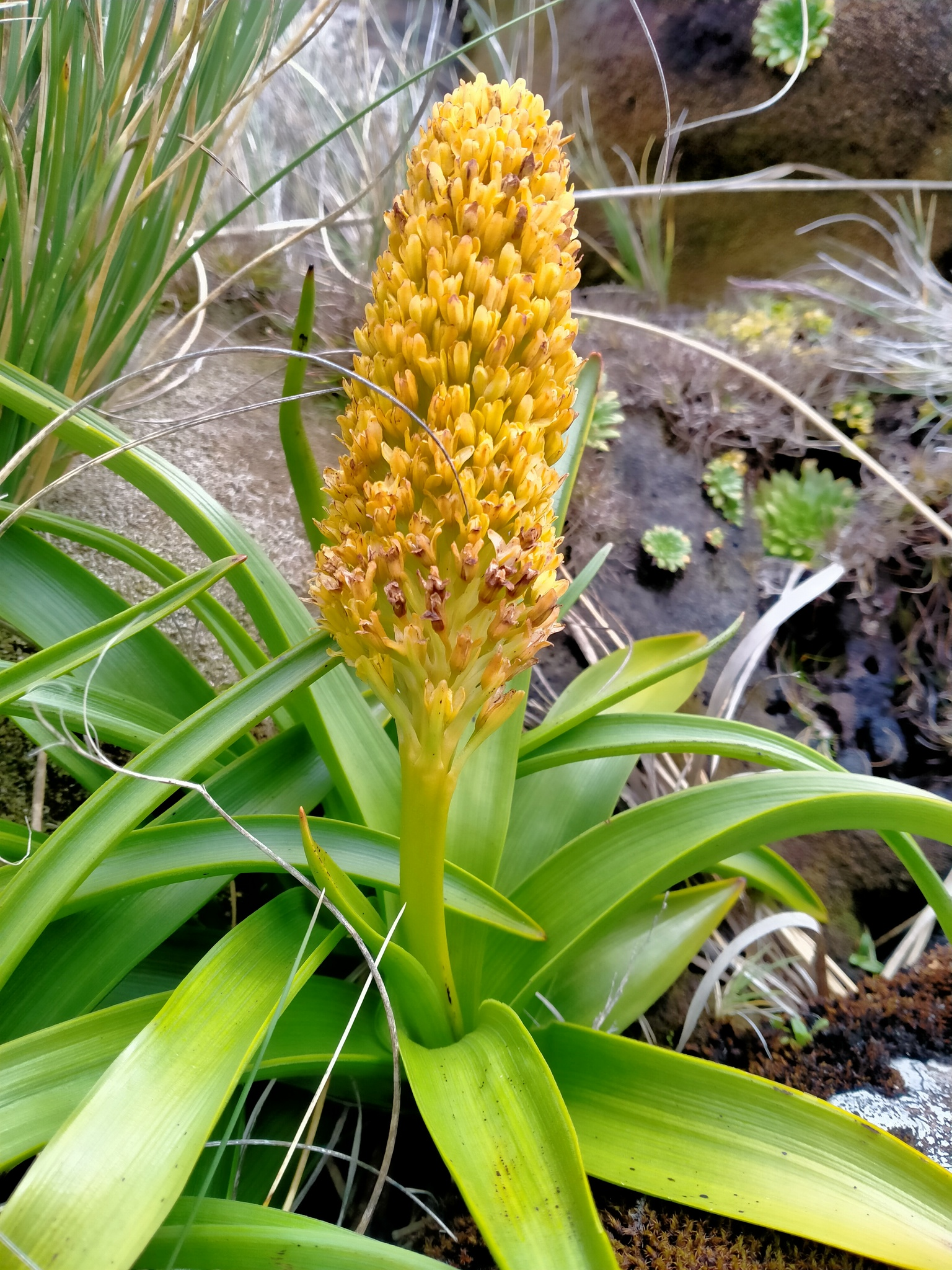

== Taxonomy ==
=== Classification ===
The Bulbinella genus was first established in 1843 by Carl Sigismund Kunth. Initially, six species from the Cape of Good Hope, in South Africa, were placed in the genus Bulbinella; three of them transferred from other genera and three of the species were described as new. In 1845, Joseph Dalton Hooker based his new genus Chrysobactron on B. rossii specimens collected from Campbell Island. The species was first published in the Flora Antarctica by him, noting that Chrysobactron was "very nearly allied" and had a similar appearance to the South African Bulbinella genus, but he decided not to move the new genus into it.

In 1906, botanist Thomas Cheeseman had more than once expressed doubts about the generic status of the New Zealand species and placed them in Bulbinella rather than in Chrysobactron. In 1952, Lucy Cranwell studied the pollination of various New Zealand plant species; in her study, she mentioned the points of similarity between the grains of South African Bulbinella species and New Zealand Chrysobactron (now known as Bulbinella) species, but no other differences were mentioned by her.

There are twenty-three species in the genus Bulbinella; seventeen of which are located in South Africa, and six in New Zealand. A 2017 thesis by Collen Musara examined the genus Bulbinella and hypothesised that B. rossii is the closest resemblance to the South African species because of B. rossii's fibrous leaf bases that other New Zealand Bulbinella species do not possess. B. rossii is closely related to B. gibbsii, but differs due to its taller stature, broader leaves (up to 60 mm wide), and cylindric racemes supported on a stout axis that is hidden by dense flowers and fruits.

=== Etymology ===
The etymology (word origin) of B. rossii's genus name, Bulbinella, derives from the Greek βολβός, which is a name for a bulb, an underground plant storage structure. Both words Bulbine and Bulbinella translate to English as 'little bulb'. The specific epithet (second part of the scientific name) rossii is named after James Ross, the leader of Hooker's expedition. Hooker decided to name the specific epithet in honour of Ross because he brought many new species to him during their short stay on Campbell Island. The species is commonly known as the Ross lily.

== Distribution ==
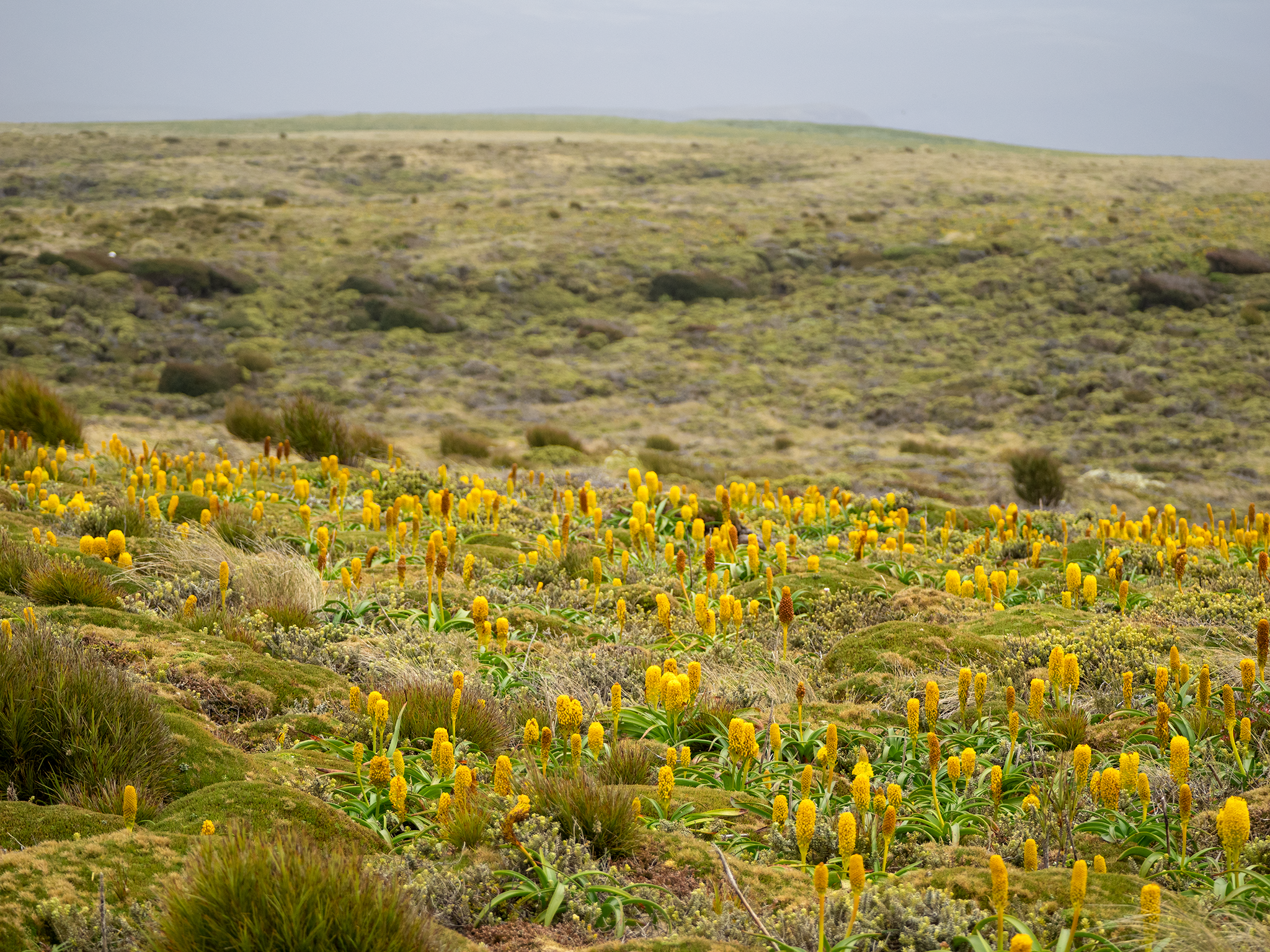
B. rossii on Enderby Island

Bulbinella species are predominantly endemic to South Africa, but six species are endemic to New Zealand, most of which are found predominantly in the South Island. B. rossii is endemic to New Zealand's subantarctic Auckland Islands and Campbell Islands. There, it is common and widespread from sea level to the highest parts of the island's mountains. Because it thrives where the ground has been disturbed, and because it is not particularly of interest to browsing animals, it is common near former human habitation sites, and may form dense colonies in open herbfields and tussock grasslands.

In 1970, botanist R. H. Taylor studied the vegetation and wildlife of Enderby Island. In his study, he noted that B. rossii appeared to be more common on the north and west sides of the island, while the south-east sides of the island appeared to be dominated by southern rātā (Metrosideros umbellata) forests.

=== Habitat ===
All New Zealand Bulbinella species are allopatric, prefer colder habitats and soils with high water content. On the main Auckland Island, B. rossii occurs from sea level to high-altitude areas; but it is uncommon at lower-altitudes and is more common at higher-altitude areas where the ground is unfavourable for B. rossii to be rooted by introduced animals. On Campbell Island, B. rossii only becomes predominant above 250–300 m (820–980 ft) above sea level.

== Ecology ==
There is a weed which they call 'Bulbinella Rosi' [sic] growing on the island, which is spreading very rapidly, and appears to be going to over-run the country. The paddocks are simply a mass of it and where it is growing very thick, no other vegetation will thrive.

— M. McKay, 1910

The roots of B. rossii are often eaten by pigs, but the species is avoided by cattle and goats. B. rossii's bitter taste also makes it unattractive to sheep. On Campbell Island in 1910, M. McKay, a stock inspector who was on the island to inform New Zealand's Ministry of Agriculture about the cases of sheep scab on the island, mentioned that B. rossii was so common on the island that it was likened to an invasive species.

A 2013 research article by the New Zealand Journal of Botany reported on the floral biology and pollination on Campbell Island. In it, the researchers observed many of Campbell Island wētā (Notoplectron campbellensis) individuals feeding on the pollen and nectar of B. rossii, with as many as eight individuals on an inflorescence. B. rossii was the most frequently visited species from their study. Other species noted in their study included: Melangyna novaezelandiae and Scoparia parmifera. B. rossii individuals are also known to be visited by hoverflies and other small flies.

A 2019 study conducted by Polar Research examinined the moths on New Zealand's subantarctic islands. Researchers noted that Ichneutica erebia, an endemic moth, was observed to visit the inflorescences of B. rossii and may be an important pollinator for the species. I. erebia moths either seek B. rossii or are capable of travelling long distances at night and have more active foraging. The seeds of B. rossii are dispersed by the wind.

== Conservation ==
Bulbinella rossii was evaluated in the most recent 2024 assessment by the New Zealand Threatened Classification System as "At Risk — Naturally Uncommon" because its distribution is confined to the Auckland and Campbell Islands groups. B. rossii appears to have no threats, and is listed because of its confined geographical area to the Auckland and Campbell Islands.

== Recognition ==
As of 2025, Bulbinella rossii is featured on the reverse of the New Zealand five-dollar note.

== Works cited ==
Books

- Cheeseman, T. F. (1906). Manual of the New Zealand flora (1 ed.). Wellington, New Zealand: New Zealand Board of Science and Art – via the Internet Archive.
- Cranwell, Lucy May (1952). New Zealand pollen studies : the monocotyledons: a comparative account. Auckland, New Zealand: Harvard University Press – via the Internet Archive.
- Gledhill, David (6 March 2008). The Names of Plants. Cambridge, United Kingdom: Cambridge University Press. ISBN 978-0-521-68553-5.
- Hooker, Joseph Dalton (1859). The Botany of the Antarctic Voyage of H.M. Discovery Ships Erebus and Terror in the years 1839–1843, under the Command of Captain Sir James Clark Ross. London, United Kingdom: Reeve Brothers – via the Internet Archive.
- Perry, Pauline L. (1999). Bulbinella in South Africa. Pretoria: National Botanical Institute. ISBN 1-919795-46-4 – via the Internet Archive.

Journals

- Buxton, Max N.; Anderson, Barbara J.; Hoare, Robert J.B.; Lord, Janice M. (12 December 2019). "Are moths the missing pollinators in Subantarctic New Zealand?". Polar Research. 38 (0). Norwegian Polar Institute. doi:10.33265/polar.v38.3545. ISSN 0800-0395.
- Godley, E. J. (1982). "Breeding systems in New Zealand plants 6. Gentiana antarctica and G. antipoda". New Zealand Journal of Botany. 20 (4): 405–420. doi:10.1080/0028825X.1982.10428511. ISSN 0028-825X.
- Horton Hartley, Karri; Beattie, James; Lord, Janice M. (19 December 2022). "Shepherds to the subantarctic: The history and legacy of pasture plant introductions on Campbell Island / Motu Ihupuku, 1895–1931". International Review of Environmental History. 8 (2): 103–125. doi:10.22459/IREH.08.02.2022.06. hdl:1885/286706. ISSN 2205-3212.
- Johnson, P. N.; Campbell, D. J. (1975). "Vascular Plants of the Auckland Islands". New Zealand Journal of Botany. 13 (4): 665–720. doi:10.1080/0028825X.1975.10430354. ISSN 0028-825X.
- Little, Lorna; Eidesen, Pernille Bronken; Müller, Eike; Dickinson, Katharine J.M.; Lord, Janice M. (2016). "Leaf and floral heating in cold climates: do sub-Antarctic megaherbs resemble tropical alpine giants?". Polar Research. 35 (1) 26030. doi:10.3402/polar.v35.26030. ISSN 1751-8369.
- Lord, JM; Huggins, L; Little, LM; Tomlinson, VR (2013). "Floral biology and flower visitors on subantarctic Campbell Island". New Zealand Journal of Botany. 51 (3): 168–180. doi:10.1080/0028825X.2013.801867. ISSN 0028-825X.
- McGlone, M.S.; Moar, N.T. (1997). "Pollen-vegetation relationships on the subantarctic Auckland Islands, New Zealand". Review of Palaeobotany and Palynology. 96 (3–4): 317–338. doi:10.1016/S0034-6667(96)00058-9. ISSN 0034-6667.
- Moore, L. B. (1964). "The New Zealand Species of Bulbinella (Liliaceae)". New Zealand Journal of Botany. 2 (3): 286–304. doi:10.1080/0028825X.1964.10443948. ISSN 0028-825X.
- Musara, Collen; Spies, Paula; Spies, Johanne J.; Stedje, Brita (9 July 2017). "A review of Bulbinella (Asphodelaceae): distribution, conservation status, and economic importance". Botanical Sciences. 95 (2): 155–168. doi:10.17129/botsci.696. ISSN 2007-4476.
- Richardson, Alistair T.B.; Lord, Janice M.; Perry, Nigel B. (2017). "Phenylanthraquinones and flavone-C-glucosides from the disjunct Bulbinella in New Zealand". Phytochemistry. 134: 64–70. doi:10.1016/j.phytochem.2016.11.014. ISSN 0031-9422.
- McGlone, Matt S.; Wilmshurst, Janet M.; Richardson, Sarah J.; Turney, Chris S.M.; Wood, Jamie R. (7 November 2019). "Temperature, Wind, Cloud, and the Postglacial Tree Line History of Sub-Antarctic Campbell Island". Forests. 10 (11): 998. doi:10.3390/f10110998. ISSN 1999-4907.
- Pattemore, De (2013). "Recent advances in pollination biology in New Zealand". New Zealand Journal of Botany. 51 (3): 147–154. doi:10.1080/0028825X.2013.813558. ISSN 0028-825X.
- Perry, P.L. (1987). "A synoptic review of the genus Bulbinella (Asphodelaceae) in South Africa". South African Journal of Botany. 53 (6): 431–444. doi:10.1016/S0254-6299(16)31377-1. ISSN 0254-6299.
- Taylor, R. H. (1971). "Influence of man on vegetation and wildlife of enderby and Rose Islands, Auckland Islands". New Zealand Journal of Botany. 9 (2): 225–268. doi:10.1080/0028825X.1971.10429139. ISSN 0028-825X.

Miscellaneous

- De Lange, Peter (2025). "Bulbinella rossii". New Zealand Plant Conservation Network. Archived from the original on 12 August 2024.
- De Lange, Peter J.; Gosden, Jane; Courtney, Shannel; Fergus, Alexander Jon; Barkla, John W.; Beadel, S. M.; Champion, Paul D.; Hindmarsh-Walls, Rowan; Makan, Troy; Michel, Pascale (29 October 2024). "Conservation status of vascular plants in Aotearoa New Zealand, 2023" (PDF). Department of Conservation. ISSN 2324-1713. Archived (PDF) from the original on 10 February 2025.
- Musara, Collen (2017). Studies on South African and New Zealand species of Bulbinella using nuclear and chloroplast sequence data (Doctor of Philosophy thesis). University of the Free State.
- "New Zealand Threat Classification System | Bulbinella rossii (Hook.f.) Cheeseman". New Zealand Threat Classification System. Department of Conservation. Archived from the original on 27 February 2025.
- "$5 banknote". Reserve Bank of New Zealand. 6 August 2024. Archived from the original on 30 March 2025.
