= Brownheaded leafroller =

Brownheaded leafroller may refer to three species of moth in the family Tortricidae:

- Ctenopseustis fraterna of New Zealand's North Island
- Ctenopseustis herana of New Zealand's South, Steward and Chatham islands
- Ctenopseustis obliquana of New Zealand and an introduced species in Hawaii
