= Ashhurst =

Settlement in Manawatū–Whanganui Region, New Zealand

Ashhurst Otangaki (Māori)
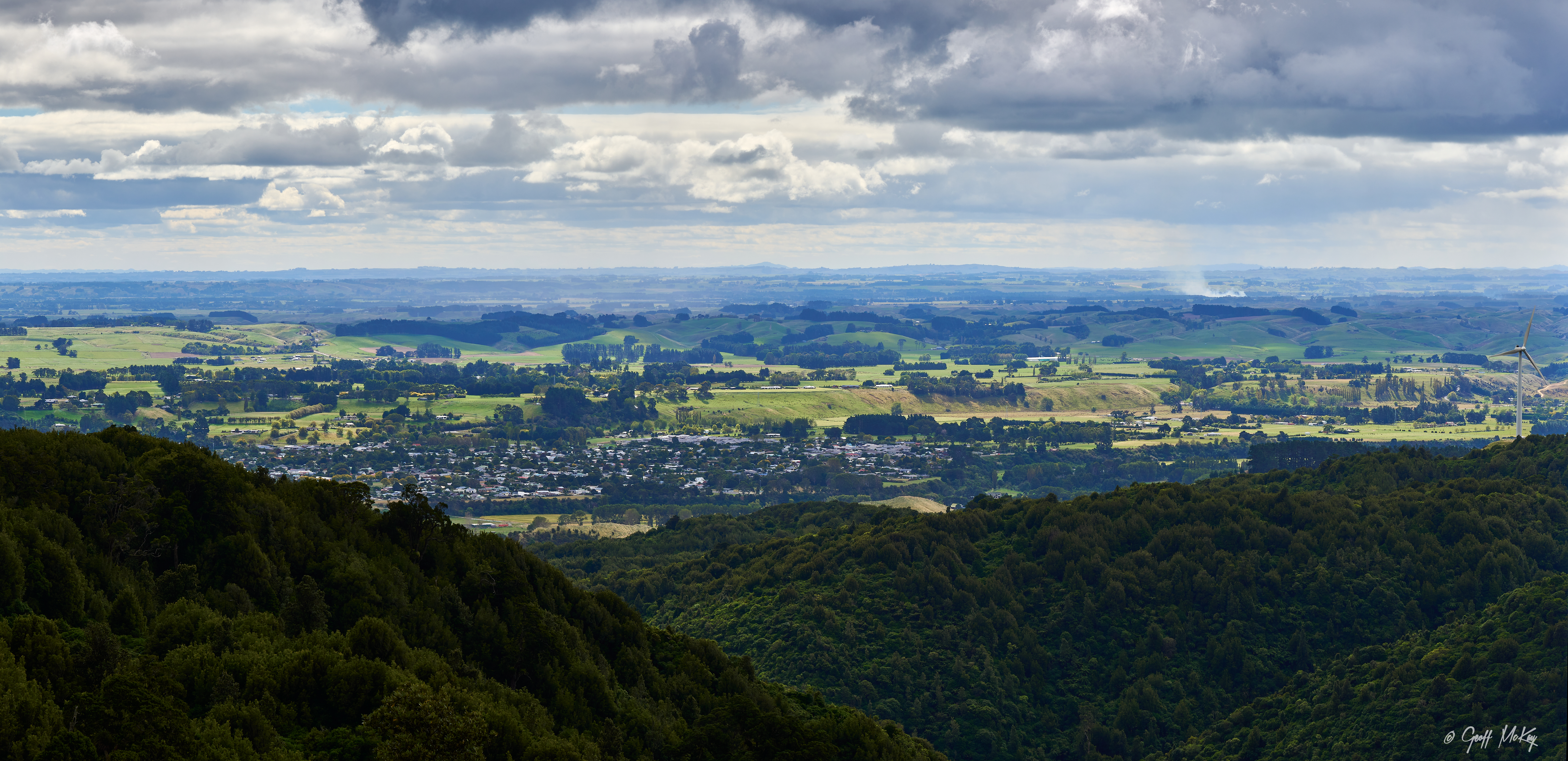
- Ashhurst seen from Te Apiti Lookout
- Interactive map of Ashhurst
- Coordinates: 40°18′S 175°45′E
- Country: New Zealand
- Region: Manawatū–Whanganui region
- Territorial authority: Palmerston North City
- Ward: Te Hirawanui General Ward; Te Pūao Māori Ward
- Electorates: Wairarapa; Te Tai Hauāuru (Māori)

Government
  - Territorial Authority: Palmerston North City Council
  - Regional council: Horizons Regional Council
  - Mayor of Palmerston North: Grant Smith
  - Wairarapa MP: TBD
  - Te Tai Hauāuru MP: Debbie Ngarewa-Packer

Area
  - Total: 4.21 km^{2} (1.63 sq mi)

Population (June 2025)
  - Total: 3,350
  - Density: 796/km^{2} (2,060/sq mi)
- Postcode: 4810

Ashhurst (Māori: Raukawa - Raukawa is an aromatic plant used to make scent) is a town and outlying suburb of Palmerston North, in the Manawatū–Whanganui region of New Zealand's North Island.

== Location ==
Ashhurst is sited 14 kilometres northeast of the Palmerston North city centre. The town stands under the Ruahine Range, beneath Wharite Peak, which is the most notable peak on the south end of the Ruahine Range, upon which is the television and radio transmitter.

== Demographics ==
Ashhurst covers 4.21 km^{2} (1.63 sq mi) and had an estimated population of 3,350 as of June 2025, with a population density of 796 people per km^{2}.

Historical population
Year	Pop.	±% p.a.
2006	2,433	—
2013	2,649	+1.22%
2018	2,934	+2.06%
2023	3,237	+1.99%

Ashhurst had a population of 3,237 in the 2023 New Zealand census, an increase of 303 people (10.3%) since the 2018 census, and an increase of 588 people (22.2%) since the 2013 census. There were 1,608 males, 1,614 females, and 12 people of other genders in 1,131 dwellings. 3.3% of people identified as LGBTIQ+. The median age was 36.1 years (compared with 38.1 years nationally). There were 771 people (23.8%) aged under 15 years, 537 (16.6%) aged 15 to 29, 1,488 (46.0%) aged 30 to 64, and 444 (13.7%) aged 65 or older.

People could identify as more than one ethnicity. The results were 86.7% European (Pākehā); 21.3% Māori; 4.2% Pasifika; 4.4% Asian; 0.6% Middle Eastern, Latin American and African New Zealanders (MELAA); and 3.8% other, which includes people giving their ethnicity as "New Zealander". English was spoken by 97.3%, Māori by 4.1%, Samoan by 0.7%, and other languages by 6.5%. No language could be spoken by 2.3% (e.g. too young to talk). New Zealand Sign Language was known by 1.0%. The percentage of people born overseas was 13.8, compared with 28.8% nationally.

Religious affiliations were 29.9% Christian, 0.6% Hindu, 0.6% Māori religious beliefs, 0.3% Buddhist, 0.5% New Age, and 1.1% other religions. People who answered that they had no religion were 58.4%, and 8.4% of people did not answer the census question.

Of those at least 15 years old, 477 (19.3%) people had a bachelor's or higher degree, 1,464 (59.4%) had a post-high school certificate or diploma, and 528 (21.4%) people exclusively held high school qualifications. The median income was $45,000, compared with $41,500 nationally. 201 people (8.2%) earned over $100,000 compared to 12.1% nationally. The employment status of those at least 15 was 1,368 (55.5%) full-time, 330 (13.4%) part-time, and 48 (1.9%) unemployed.

== Transport ==
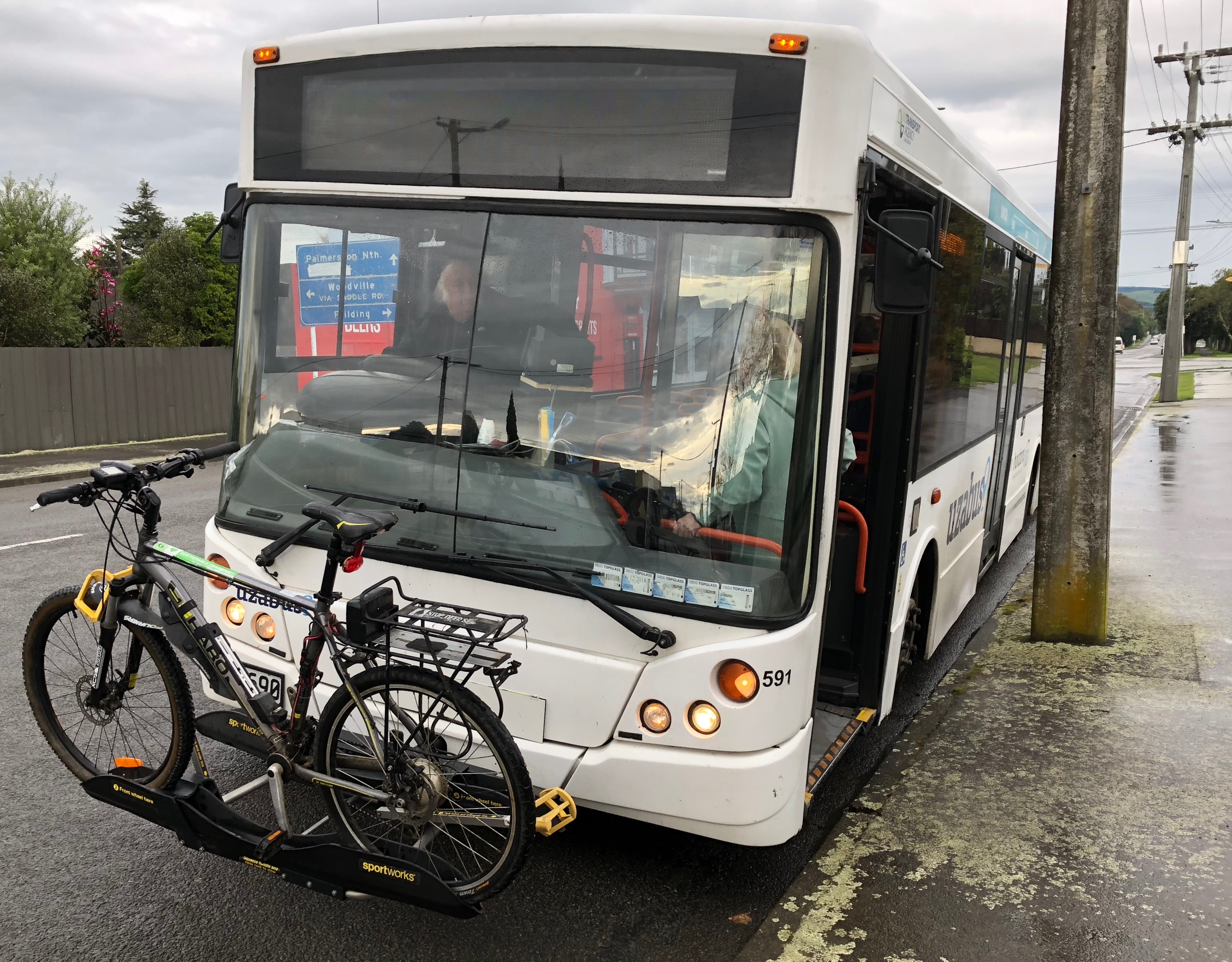
UzaBus from Palmerston North at Ashhurst in 2018

Ashhurst's importance stems from its location at the western end of the Manawatū Gorge. As such, it was close to the easiest road and rail link between the east and west coasts of the southern North Island. However, the Gorge has been closed since April 2017 and the road link to the east coast from Ashhurst is now via the four lane Manawatu Tararua Highway.

There are four buses on weekdays and one on Saturdays linking Palmerston North with Ashhurst.

== Parks and reserves ==
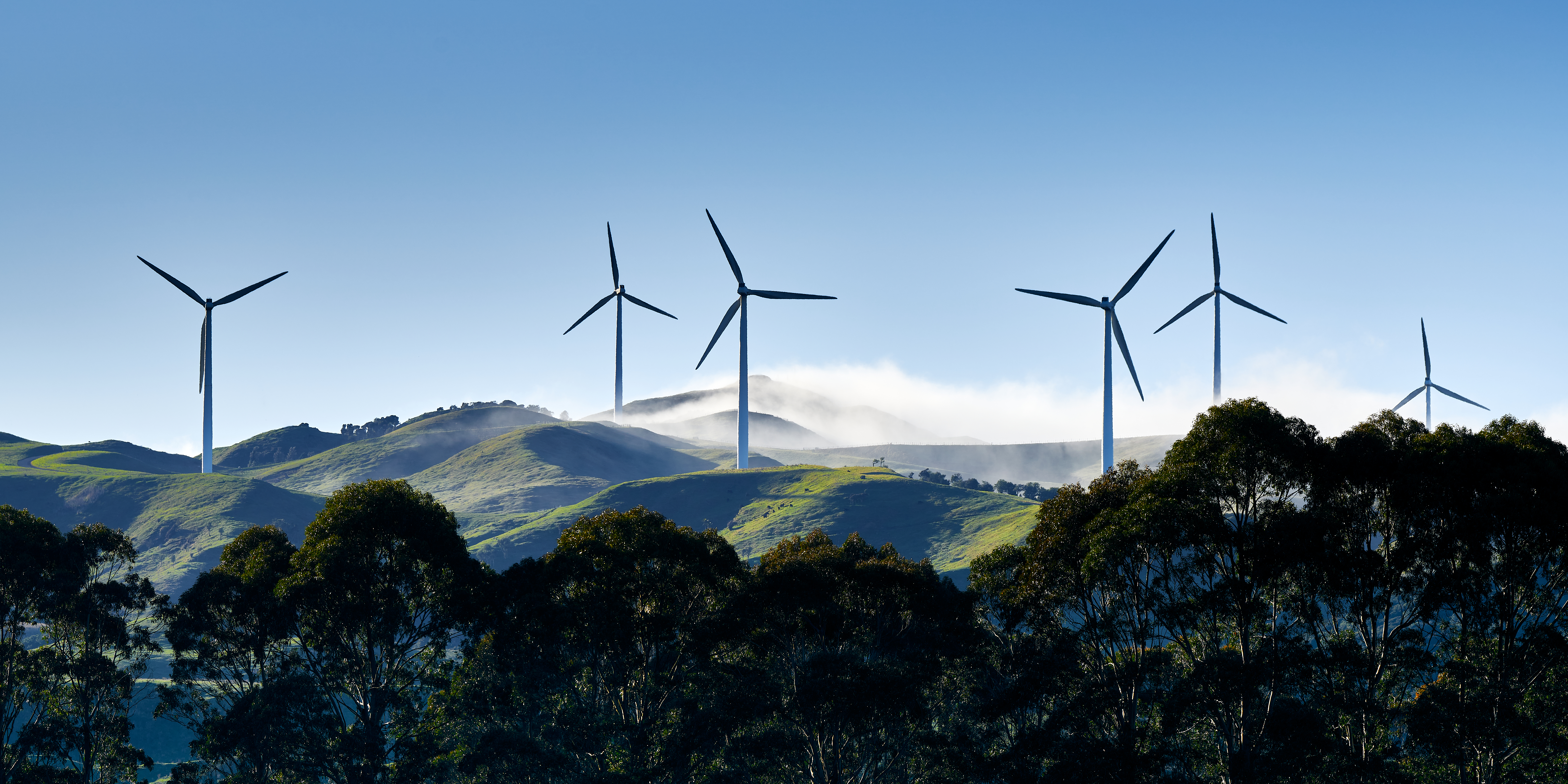
Te Āpiti Wind Farm viewed from Ashhurst Domain

- Ashhurst Domain – A large multipurpose park which includes a camping ground, a lookout to the wind farm, a cemetery and canine area.
- Durham Street Reserve and McCraes Bush Reserve
- Lincoln Park – The home ground to the local rugby team Ashhurst-Pohangina RFC

== History ==
Ashhurst was named for Lord Henry Ashhurst, who owned land in the immediate area. The Māori name for the area is Raukawa, after the native aromatic plant Pseudopanax edgerleyi, whereas for the town it is Otangaki.

== Local and central government representation ==
=== Former Ashhurst-Fitzherbert Ward ===
Ashhurst-Fitzherbert Ward was Palmerston North's largest ward covering the area from James Line to part way through the Manawatū Gorge, to just north of Ashhurst township. Wards were abolished in Palmerston North in 2013.

=== Central government ===
- Rangitīkei is represented by MP Suze Redmayne for New Zealand National Party .
- Te Tai Hauāuru is represented by Debbie Ngarewa-Packer for Te Pāti Māori.

== Education ==
Ashhurst School is a co-educational state primary school for Year 1 to 8 students, with a roll of 447 as of July 2026. It opened in 1879.

== Notable people ==
- Andre Taylor, rugby player
- Mark McGrath, darts player
