= Raukawa =

Raukawa may refer to:

- Raukaua, plant
- Ngāti Raukawa, tribe
- Merepeka Raukawa-Tait (fl. 2000s), New Zealand activist
- Cook Strait, a stretch of water in Aotearoa New Zealand which is called Raukawa, Raukawa Moana or Te Moana o Raukawa in the Māori language
