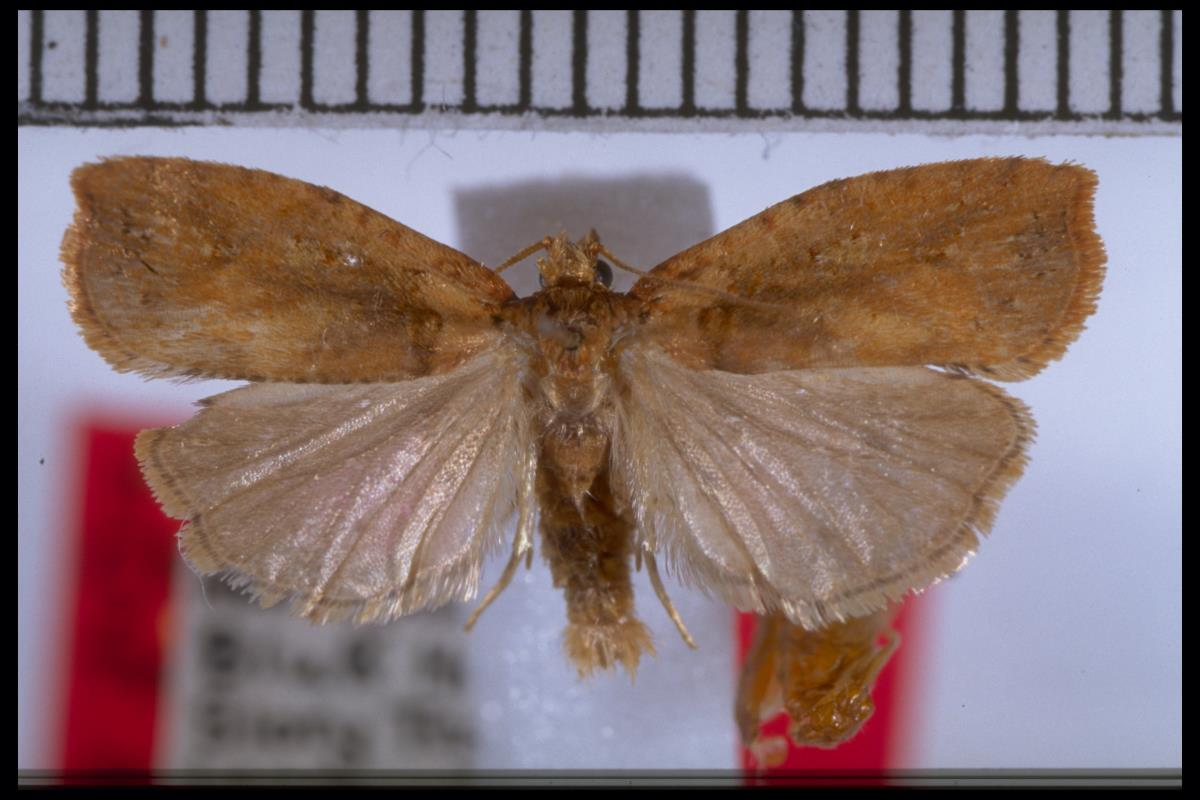
- Male holotype

Scientific classification
- Kingdom: Animalia
- Phylum: Arthropoda
- Class: Insecta
- Order: Lepidoptera
- Family: Tortricidae
- Genus: Ctenopseustis
- Species: C. filicis

Binomial name
- Ctenopseustis filicis Dugdale, 1990

= Ctenopseustis filicis =

Species of moth

Ctenopseustis filicis, also known as ginger ponga leaf-tyer, is a species of moth of the family Tortricidae. It is endemic to New Zealand and is found in the South and Stewart Islands.

== Taxonomy ==
This species was first described by John Stewart Dugdale in 1990. The male holotype specimen, collected on the Glory Track at Bluff Hill, is held in the New Zealand Arthropod Collection.

== Description ==
The larva is small and has a brown head. The wingspan of the adult moth is 19–24 mm for males and 22–28 mm for females.

== Distribution ==
This species is endemic to New Zealand and can be found on the South and Stewart Islands.

== Habitat and host species ==
The larvae feed on Dicksonia squarosa, Dicksonia fibrosa, Cyathea colensoi, Cyathea dealbata and Cyathea smithii.

== Behaviour ==
The larvae of this species create a shelter by tying together the fronds of its host species with silk webbing. Larvae can be found all year round hiding in their shelter. The adult moth can be seen all year round but most frequently in October.

== Etymology ==
The species name refers to the host plant and is derived from Latin felix (meaning fern).
