= Ctenopseustis servana =

- Illustration by Hudson.

Conservation status
- Nationally Critical (NZ TCS)

Scientific classification
- Kingdom: Animalia
- Phylum: Arthropoda
- Clade: Pancrustacea
- Class: Insecta
- Order: Lepidoptera
- Family: Tortricidae
- Genus: Ctenopseustis
- Species: C. servana

Binomial name
- Ctenopseustis servana (Walker, 1863)

Synonyms
- Teras servana Walker, 1863; Teras abjectana Walker, 1866; Teras congestana Walker, 1863; Teras contractana Walker, 1866; Teras cuneiferana Walker, 1866; Teras priscana Walker, 1863

Species of moth endemic to New Zealand

Ctenopseustis servana is a species of moth of the family Tortricidae. This species was first described by Francis Walker in 1863. It is endemic to New Zealand, where it has been recorded from the North Island, off shore islands around the North Island, and the Three Kings Islands. The species frequents coastal habitat and its larvae feed on various woody coastal plants. Despite its polyphagous nature it is not considered a pest of commercial crops. In 2025 this species was classified as "nationally critical" under the New Zealand Threat Classification System by the Department of Conservation.

== Taxonomy ==
This species was first described by Francis Walker in 1863 and originally named Teras servana. Walker, thinking he was describing different species, also named this moth Teras congestana and T. priscana in 1863, and T. abjectana, T. contractana and T. cuneiferana in 1866. In 1911 Edward Meyrick placed Teras servana in the genus Ctenopseustis as a synonym of C. obliquana. George Hudson followed Meyrick and treated C. servana as a synonym of C. obliquana in his 1928 book The butterflies and moths of New Zealand. In 1982 Chris J. Green and John S. Dugdale reinstated C. servana as a valid species and synonymised T. priscana, T. congestana, T. cuneiferana, T. abjectana and T. contractana within it. Dugdale confirmed this placement in his 1988 publication. In 1990 Dugdale undertook a further reassessment of Ctenopseustis and again confirmed the placement of this species. The female holotype, collected by Daniel Bolton in Auckland, is held at the Natural History Museum, London.

== Description ==
Walker originally described the female of this species as follows:

Female. Cinereous, slightly tinged with fawn-colour. Wings with numerous minute transverse darker streaks. Fore wings rectangular at the tips; costa slightly convex towards the base ; exterior border slightly convex and oblique. Hind wings cinereous. Length of the body 4 lines; of the wings 12 lines.

The base colour of this species is a taupe-brown with the female having slightly darker markings on the forewings and the male has even more obvious darker markings. This species has four shaded blotches that align with the upper margin of the forewing.

== Distribution ==
C. servana is endemic to New Zealand. It has been observed in the North Island, on off shore islands around the North Island and is the only species in this genus to be found on Three Kings Islands. It has can be found no greater than 2 km from the North Island coastline but has not been observed on the coast of Bay of Plenty, Gisborne, Hawkes Bay and the Wairarapa.

== Habitat and hosts ==
C. servana frequents coastal habitat. The larvae are polyphagous, feeding on various woody coastal angiosperms, including Hedera helix, Ligustrum sinense, Coprosma repens, Corynocarpus laevigatus, Meryta sinclairii, Metrosideros excelsa, Myoporum laetum and Vitex lucens. It has been observed co-existing with its sister species C. obliquana.

== Human interactions ==
Although the larvae feed on both introduced and native plants this species is not considered a pest species as it does not damage plants of economic value.

== Conservation status ==
In 2025 this species was classified as "Nationally Critical" with the report stating that this species is biologically sparse, is impacted by climate change, is in need of conservation research, has a lack of data on both the population size as well as how the population is changing over time, suffers from population fragmentation and is relict.
