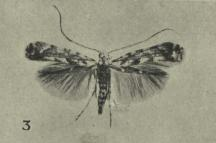

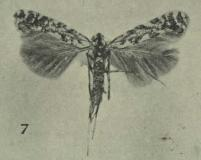
- North Island form

Scientific classification
- Kingdom: Animalia
- Phylum: Arthropoda
- Clade: Pancrustacea
- Class: Insecta
- Order: Lepidoptera
- Family: Gracillariidae
- Genus: Acrocercops
- Species: A. panacitorsens

Binomial name
- Acrocercops panacitorsens (Watt, 1920)

Synonyms
- Parectopa panacitorsens Watt, 1920; Eumetriochroa panacitorsens (Watt, 1920)

= Acrocercops panacitorsens =

Species of moth

Acrocercops panacitorsens or Eumetriochroa panacitorsens is a moth of the family Gracillariidae. It is endemic to New Zealand. In 2019 Robert Hoare proposed that this species be provisionally assigned to the genus Eumetriochroa.

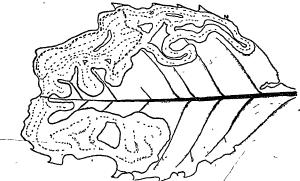
Mine

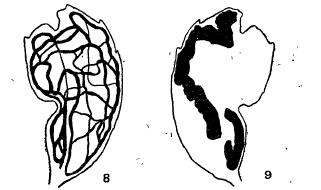
8: mining track, underside leaf; 9: mining track, upperside leaf

The wingspan is about 9 mm. There is a separate variety of this species on the North Island. This variety is slightly smaller, with a wingspan of about 8 mm.

The larvae feed on Pseudopanax arboreus and Raukaua simplex. They mine the leaves of their host plant. The mine is entirely on the under-surface of the leaf. Throughout its whole course it is a simple gallery, and very tortuous in its direction. The chief direction is in the long axis of the leaf, and the outer portions of the leaf are more mined than the centre. The gallery twists and turns, and in its course follows so close against the earlier portions that the partition between them is broken down, and finally the entire mine appears to form a huge blotch occupying about one half the leaf-surface. Though thus closely following its former track, it rarely crosses it except under direct need. The midrib forms a barrier, except in its upper and thinner part, where it is invariably crossed. The colour in the early stages of the mine is white with a fine brown central line occupied by the frass. The remainder of the mine is a shade paler green than the rest of the leaf.
