= Raukaua gunnii =

Scientific classification
- Kingdom: Plantae
- Clade: Tracheophytes
- Clade: Angiosperms
- Clade: Eudicots
- Clade: Asterids
- Order: Apiales
- Family: Araliaceae
- Genus: Raukaua
- Species: R. gunnii

Binomial name
- Raukaua gunnii (Hook.f.) Frodin

Synonyms
- Pseudopanax gunnii (Hook.f.) K.Koch

Species of flowering plant

Raukaua gunnii is a species of plant in the family Araliaceae native to Tasmania. It was previously known as Pseudopanax gunnii, but was found not to be closely related to the core members of Pseudopanax.
