= Ctenopseustis =

Scientific classification
- Kingdom: Animalia
- Phylum: Arthropoda
- Clade: Pancrustacea
- Class: Insecta
- Order: Lepidoptera
- Family: Tortricidae
- Tribe: Archipini
- Genus: Ctenopseustis; Meyrick, 1885

Genus of tortrix moths

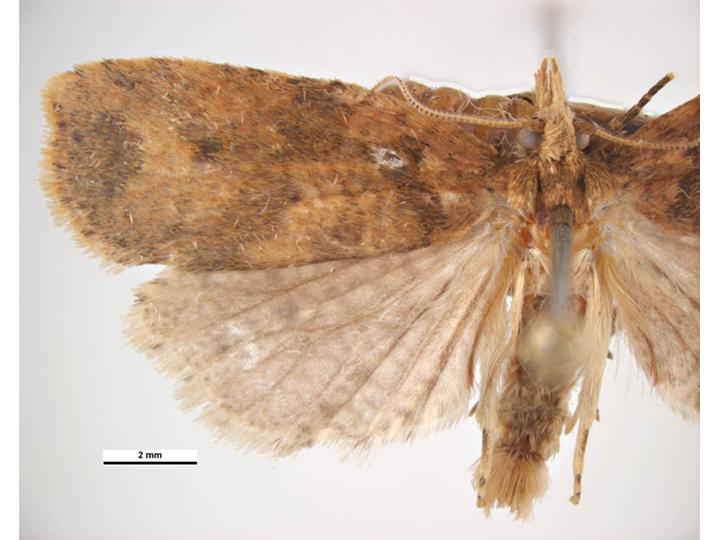
Ctenopseustis herana, male

Ctenopseustis is a genus of moths belonging to the subfamily Tortricinae of the family Tortricidae. This species was first described by Edward Meyrick in January 1885. Later in 1885 Meyrick gave a fuller description of this species.

== Species ==
- Ctenopseustis filicis Dugdale, 1990
- Ctenopseustis fraterna Philpott, 1930
- Ctenopseustis haplodryas Meyrick, 1920
- Ctenopseustis herana (Felder & Rogenhofer, 1875)
- Ctenopseustis obliquana (Walker, 1863)
- Ctenopseustis servana (Walker, 1863)

== See also ==
- List of Tortricidae genera
