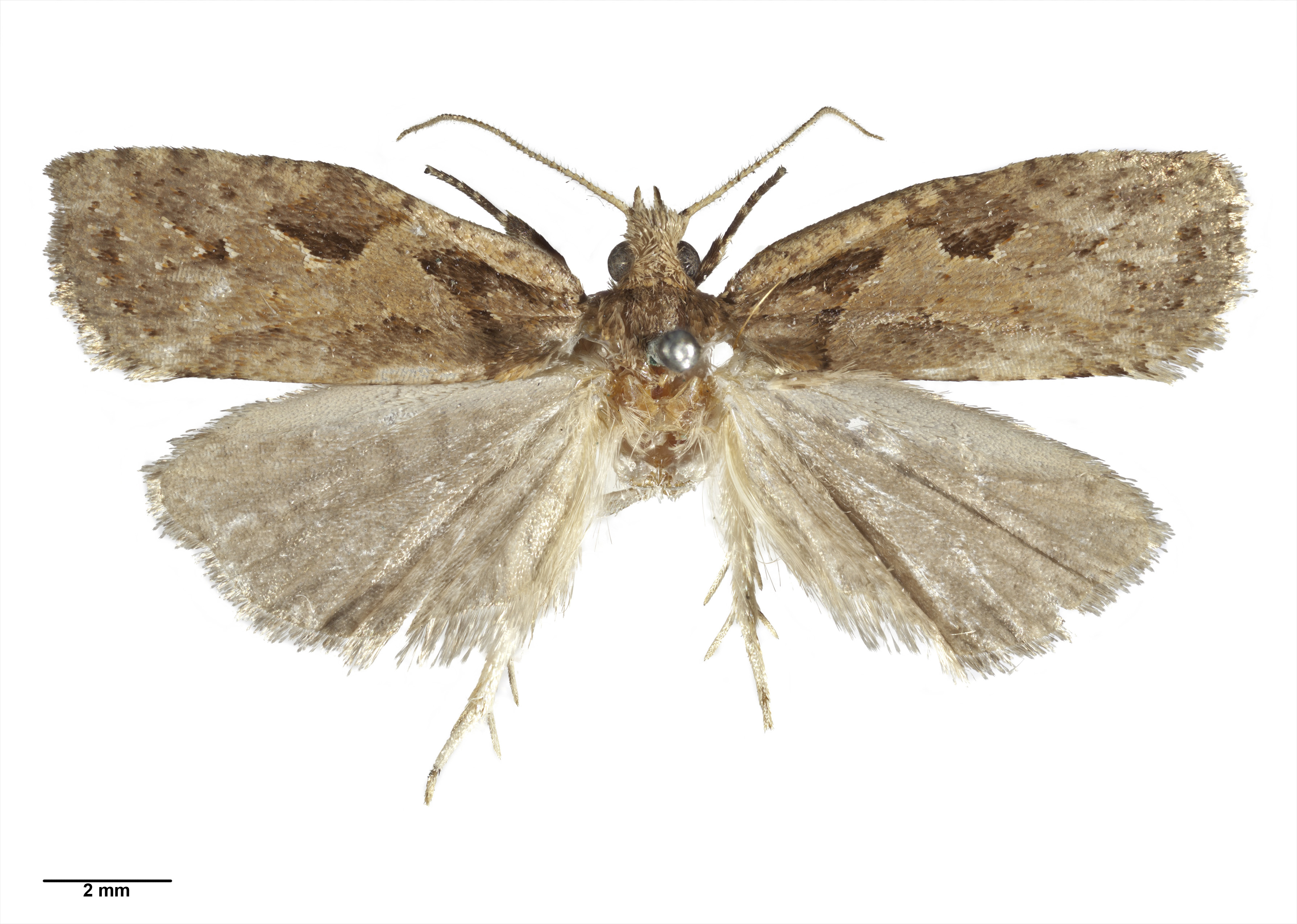
- Holotype specimen

Scientific classification
- Domain: Eukaryota
- Kingdom: Animalia
- Phylum: Arthropoda
- Class: Insecta
- Order: Lepidoptera
- Family: Tortricidae
- Genus: Ctenopseustis
- Species: C. fraterna

Binomial name
- Ctenopseustis fraterna Philpott, 1930

= Ctenopseustis fraterna =

Species of moth

Ctenopseustis fraterna, the brownheaded leafroller or the rusty ponga leaf-tyer, is a species of moth of the family Tortricidae. It is found in New Zealand, where it has been recorded from the North Island only. The common name is also used for the related species Ctenopseustis herana and Ctenopseustis obliquana.

== Description ==
The larva has a green coloured body and brown head.

== Behaviour ==
The larvae of this species create a silken shelter by tying together the fronds of its host and then hides within this creation. The adult moth is on the wing all year round.

== Hosts ==
The larvae feed on Cyathea dealbata, Cyathea smithii, Dicksonia fibrosa, Dicksonia squarrosa and Sticherus cunninghamii.
