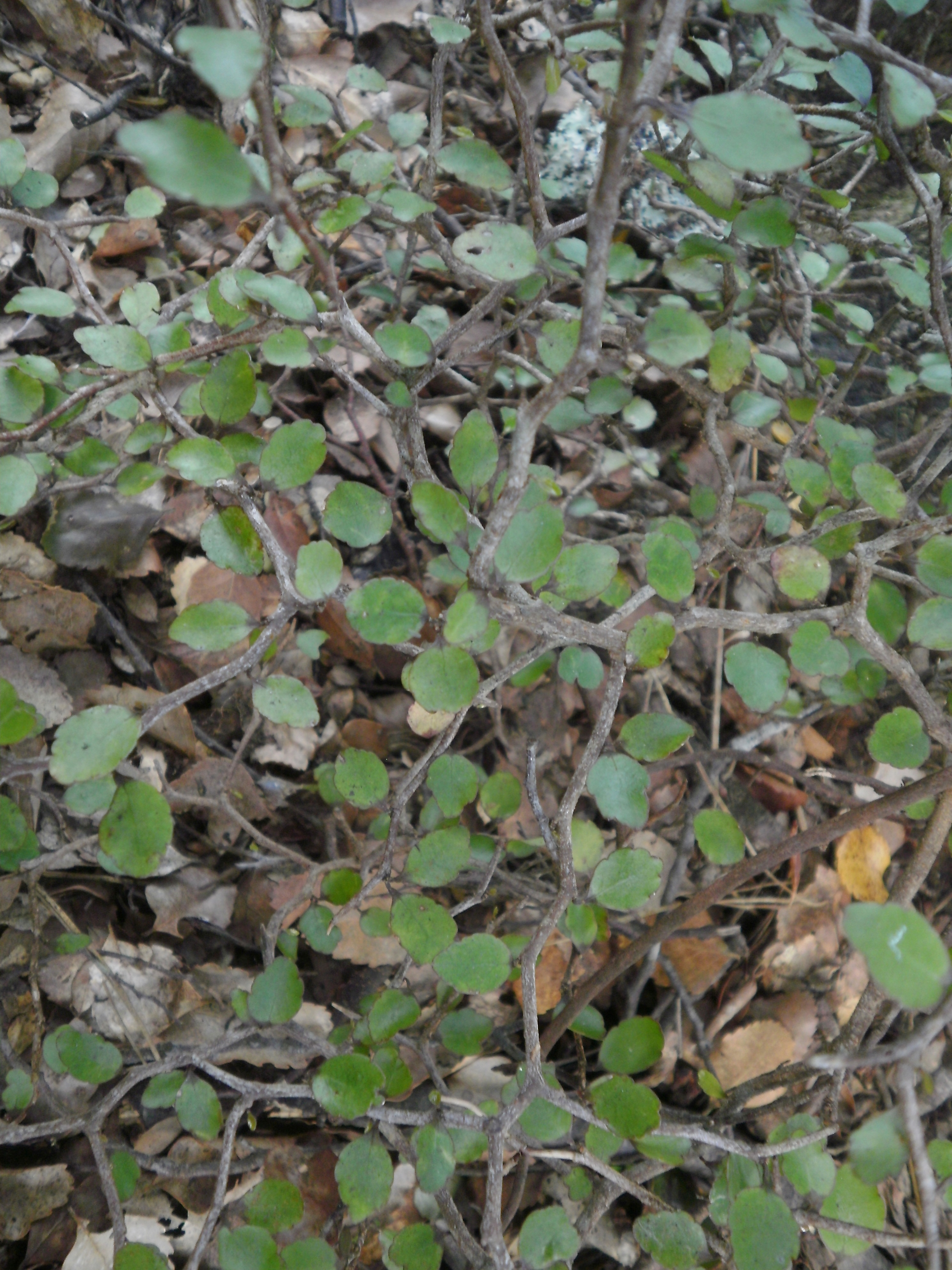

Scientific classification
- Kingdom: Plantae
- Clade: Tracheophytes
- Clade: Angiosperms
- Clade: Eudicots
- Clade: Asterids
- Order: Apiales
- Family: Araliaceae
- Genus: Raukaua
- Species: R. anomalus

Binomial name
- Raukaua anomalus (Hook.f.) A.D.Mitch., Frodin et Heads

Synonyms
- Neopanax anomalum

= Raukaua anomalus =

Species of shrub

Raukaua anomalus is a species of shrub native to New Zealand. It is found throughout the country from lowland to montane shrub and forest areas.

Raukaua anomalus grows up to 3 metres tall with small 1–3 cm long leaves that are alternately arranged along the densely divaricating branches.

Raukaua anomalus produces tiny green-white flowers along its branches from November to January. This is followed by small (5 mm) white berries with purple marks.
