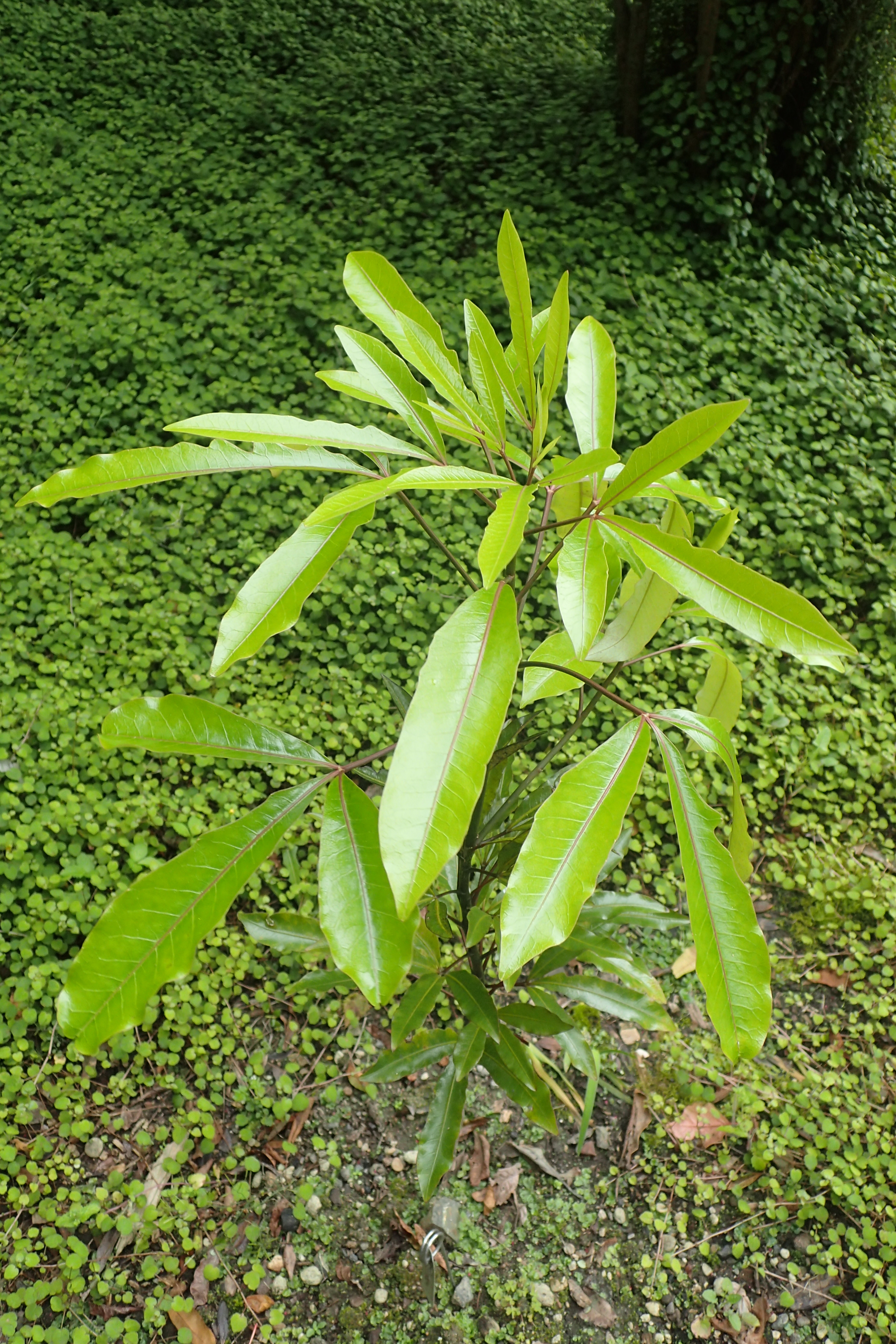

Scientific classification
- Kingdom: Plantae
- Clade: Tracheophytes
- Clade: Angiosperms
- Clade: Eudicots
- Clade: Asterids
- Order: Apiales
- Family: Araliaceae
- Genus: Raukaua
- Species: R. edgerleyi

Binomial name
- Raukaua edgerleyi (Hook.f.) Seem. (1866)

Synonyms
- Nothopanax edgerleyi (Hook.f.) Harms (1894); Panax edgerleyi Hook.f. (1852); Pseudopanax edgerleyi (Hook.f.) K.Koch (1859)

= Raukaua edgerleyi =

Species of plant

Raukaua edgerleyi is a species of plant which is native to New Zealand. An example occurrence in Westland District podocarp/broadleaf forests includes flora associates such as Cyathea smithii, Dicksonia squarrosa and Blechnum discolor.
