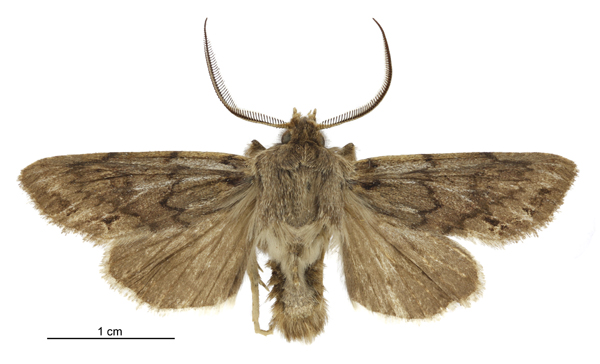
- Male

Scientific classification
- Kingdom: Animalia
- Phylum: Arthropoda
- Clade: Pancrustacea
- Class: Insecta
- Order: Lepidoptera
- Superfamily: Noctuoidea
- Family: Noctuidae
- Genus: Ichneutica
- Species: I. erebia

Binomial name
- Ichneutica erebia (Hudson, 1909)

Synonyms
- Melanchra erebia Hudson, 1909; Graphania erebia (Hudson, 1909); Melanchra oceanica Salmon, 1956; Graphania oceanica (Salmon, 1956); Graphania mutans erebia Dugdale, 1971

= Ichneutica erebia =

Species of moth

Ichneutica erebia is a moth of the family Noctuidae. This species is endemic to New Zealand and is found on Campbell Island and the Auckland Islands. Adults of this species are on the wing from August to January. The adults are variable in appearance but can be distinguished from similar species by the patters or lack thereof on their forewings. The larvae of I. erebia are polyphagous and hosts include Pleurophyllum criniferum, species within the genera Stilbocarpa and Carex, as well as Chionochloa antarctica, Urtica australis and Raukaua simplex.

== Taxonomy ==
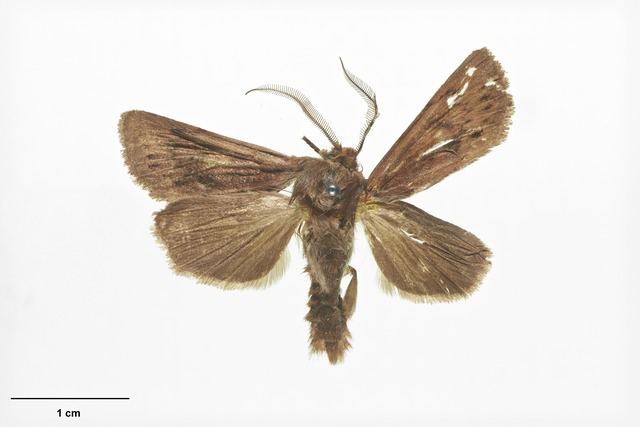
Holotype of I. erebia.

This species was first described by George Hudson in 1909 using a single female specimen collected by R. Browne at Erebus Cove at Port Ross. Hudson originally named the species Melanchra erebia. The holotype specimen is held at the Museum of New Zealand Te Papa Tongarewa. In 1956 John Salmon, thinking he was describing a new species, named it Melanchra oceanica. In 1971 this name was synonymised with Melanchra erebia by J. S. Dugdale and the species was treated by him as being a subspecies of Graphania mutans, that is Graphania mutans erebia. In his 1988 catalogue Dugdale reconsidered and raised the species to species rank, discussing it under the name Graphania erebia. In 2019 Robert Hoare undertook a major review of New Zealand Noctuidae species. During this review the genus Ichneutica was greatly expanded and the genus Graphania was subsumed into that genus as a synonym. As a result of this review, this species is now known as Ichneutica erebia.

== Description ==
Dugdale gives a detailed description of the larva of I. erebia in his 1971 publication and described the pupa as follows:

Abdomen nearly twice as long as wing case, 5th abdominal segment with 4–5 irregular rows of punctures anterior to the spiracle.

Hudson described the adults of the species as follows:

The expansion of the wings is a little over 1 5/8 in. The head is very roughly scaled, with tufts of scales at the bases of the antennae, brownish-red mixed with black. The palpi are rather short, slender, tipped with dull white. The antennae are serrate, each serration being clothed with two extremely fine hairs. The thorax is reddish-grey, with moderate anterior crest and two rather prominent reddish-brown and black lateral markings. The abdomen is dull brownish-grey. The fore-wings are moderately broad, with the apex rounded and the termen moderately bowed; dull grey with black markings, speckled with reddish-brown scales, especially near the base; a broad much-broken transverse line at the base; a wavy broad shaded transverse line at about 1/4 connected with the first transverse line near the costa and termen; a broad pale central band; a branched transverse line, the two branches starting at 2/3 and 3/4 of costa respectively, uniting near the middle of the wing, and reaching the dorsum at about 3/4; this line is very deeply indented towards the termen; a subterminal row of blackish dots. The hindwings are dark brownish-grey. The cilia of all the wings appear to be pale brownish-ochreous.

The male of the species has a wingspan of between 33 and 43 mm and the female has a wingspan of between 39 and 43 mm. I. erebia is a variable species. It may possibly be confused with I. pagaia but can be distinguished by the pattern on the forewings of the later species. Hoare states that the forewings of I. erebia "lack the distinct W-shaped evagination of the forewing subterminal line" found on specimens of I. pagaia.

== Distribution ==
This species is endemic to New Zealand and is found on Campbell Island and the Auckland Islands.

== Habitat ==
I. erebia is adapted to existing in subantarctic habitat.

== Behaviour ==
The adults of this species are on the wing from August to January. This species of moth has been shown to be capable of pollinating subantarctic plants.

== Life history and host species ==
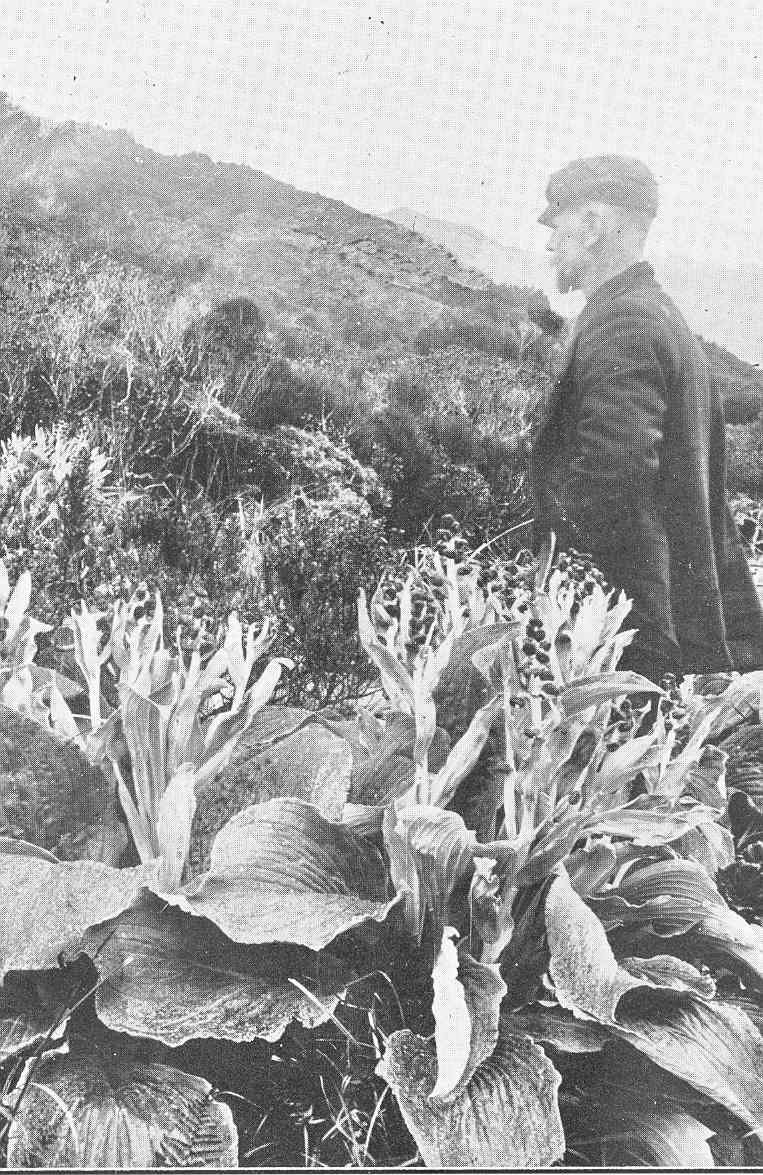
Host species Pleurophyllum criniforum on Adams Island. Image was taken during the expedition that collected the type specimen of I. erebia.

The larvae of I. erebia feeds on various herbaceous plants with known hosts being Pleurophyllum criniferum as well as species of Stilbocarpa and Carex. Chionochloa antarctica, Urtica australis and Raukaua simplex are all probable hosts as larvae of I. erebia have also been found on these species.
