= Ctenopseustis haplodryas =

Scientific classification
- Domain: Eukaryota
- Kingdom: Animalia
- Phylum: Arthropoda
- Class: Insecta
- Order: Lepidoptera
- Family: Tortricidae
- Genus: Ctenopseustis
- Species: C. haplodryas

Binomial name
- Ctenopseustis haplodryas Meyrick, 1920

Species of moth

Ctenopseustis haplodryas is a species of moth of the family Tortricidae. It is found in Kenya, where it has been recorded from the west slope of Mount Kenya.
