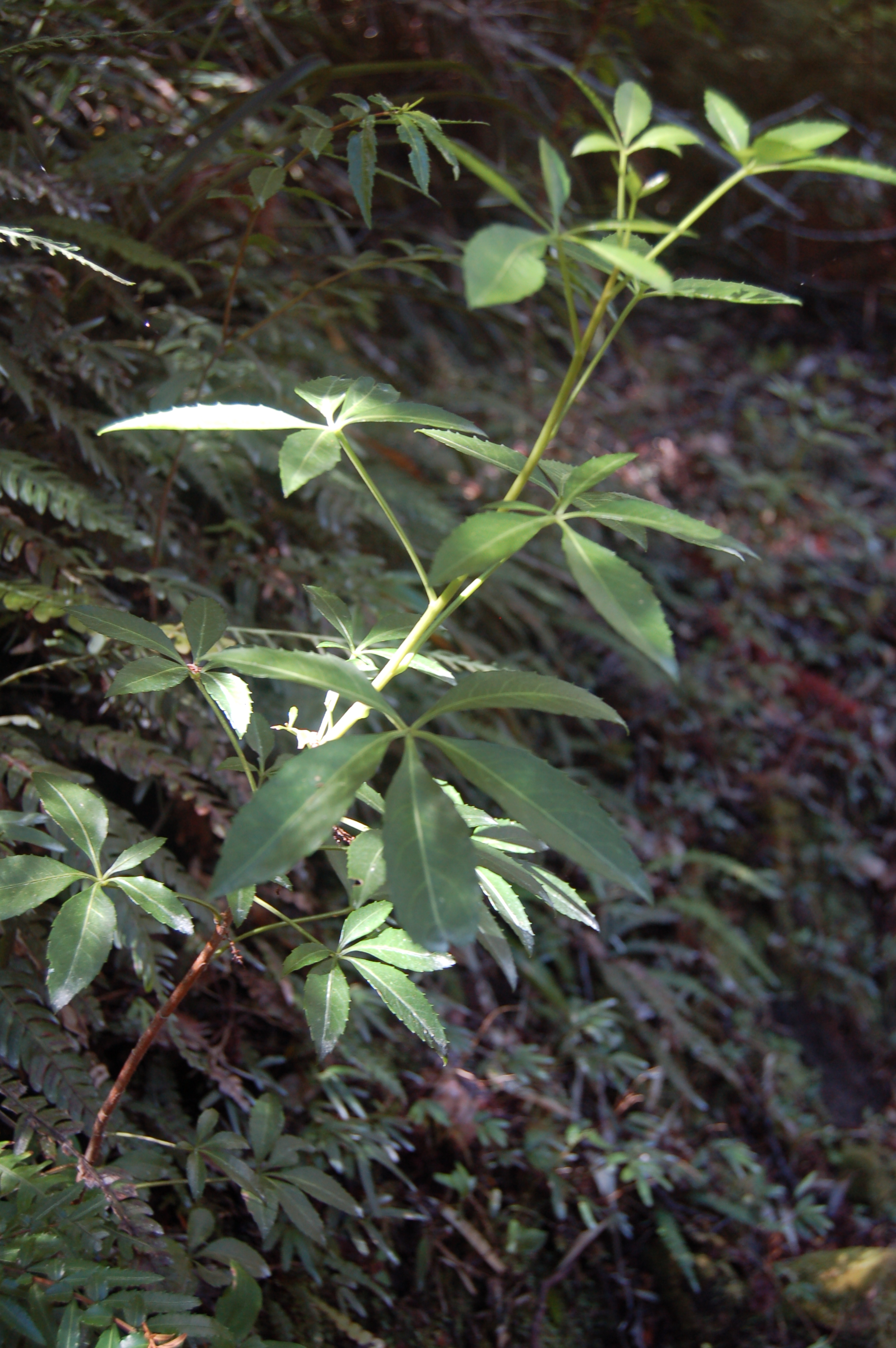
- Raukaua laetevirens (juvenile)

Scientific classification
- Kingdom: Plantae
- Clade: Tracheophytes
- Clade: Angiosperms
- Clade: Eudicots
- Clade: Asterids
- Order: Apiales
- Family: Araliaceae
- Genus: Raukaua
- Species: R. laetevirens

Binomial name
- Raukaua laetevirens (Gay) Frodin

Synonyms
- Pseudopanax laetevirens

= Raukaua laetevirens =

Species of tree

Raukaua laetevirens, known as traumen and sauco del diablo (devil's elder), is a species of plant in the family Araliaceae native to Chile and adjacent parts of Argentina. It occurs from Maule (35°50'S) to Punta Arenas (53°S). It grows in rainforests and near water courses.

== Description ==
It is an evergreen tree or shrub with ash-coloured bark, measuring up to 6 m (20 ft) in height. The leaves are composite, alternate, the petioles are 2–8 cm long, thickened at the base, the leaves are digitate, with uneven leaflets, light green glossy in color, leathery, oblong-lanceolate, attenuate at both ends, toothed edges 3-8 long and 1-1,6 wide, the flowers are hermaphrodite, pedicellate, clustered in 2-5 in inflorescences with many racemes, the flowers are formed by a floral tube 1.5 mm long, the calyx is split in 5 tepals and 5 thick whitish-green ovate-lanceolate sepals, with a mucro 2 mm at the acute apex, 5 stamens with whitish anthers, loculate inferous ovary 3-5, 4-5 styles, the fruit is a brown spherical drupe 5-5.5 mm in diameter, crowned by two styles.
