= Polar Research =

- Discipline: Polar regions of Earth
- Language: English

Publication details
- History: 1982-present
- Publisher: Norwegian Polar Institute (Norway)
- Frequency: Single annual volume
- Open access: Yes
- License: Creative Commons Attribution-NonCommercial 4.0
- Impact factor: 1.3 (2024)

Standard abbreviations
- ISO 4: Polar Res.

Indexing
- ISSN: 0800-0395

Links
- Journal homepage

Polar Research is the peer-reviewed, multi-disciplinary scholarly journal published by the Norwegian Polar Institute. Since it was launched in 1982, the journal has covered a wide range of fields from biology to oceanography, as well as socio-economic and environmental management topics relevant to the Arctic and Antarctica. The journal publishes full-length research articles, brief research notes, Perspective pieces and the occasional book review and editorial.

In 2010, Polar Research became the first of the multidisciplinary polar journals to become all open access; print editions were discontinued that same year. All the journal's articles, from 1982 to the present, are freely available in multiple digital formats on the journal's website.
