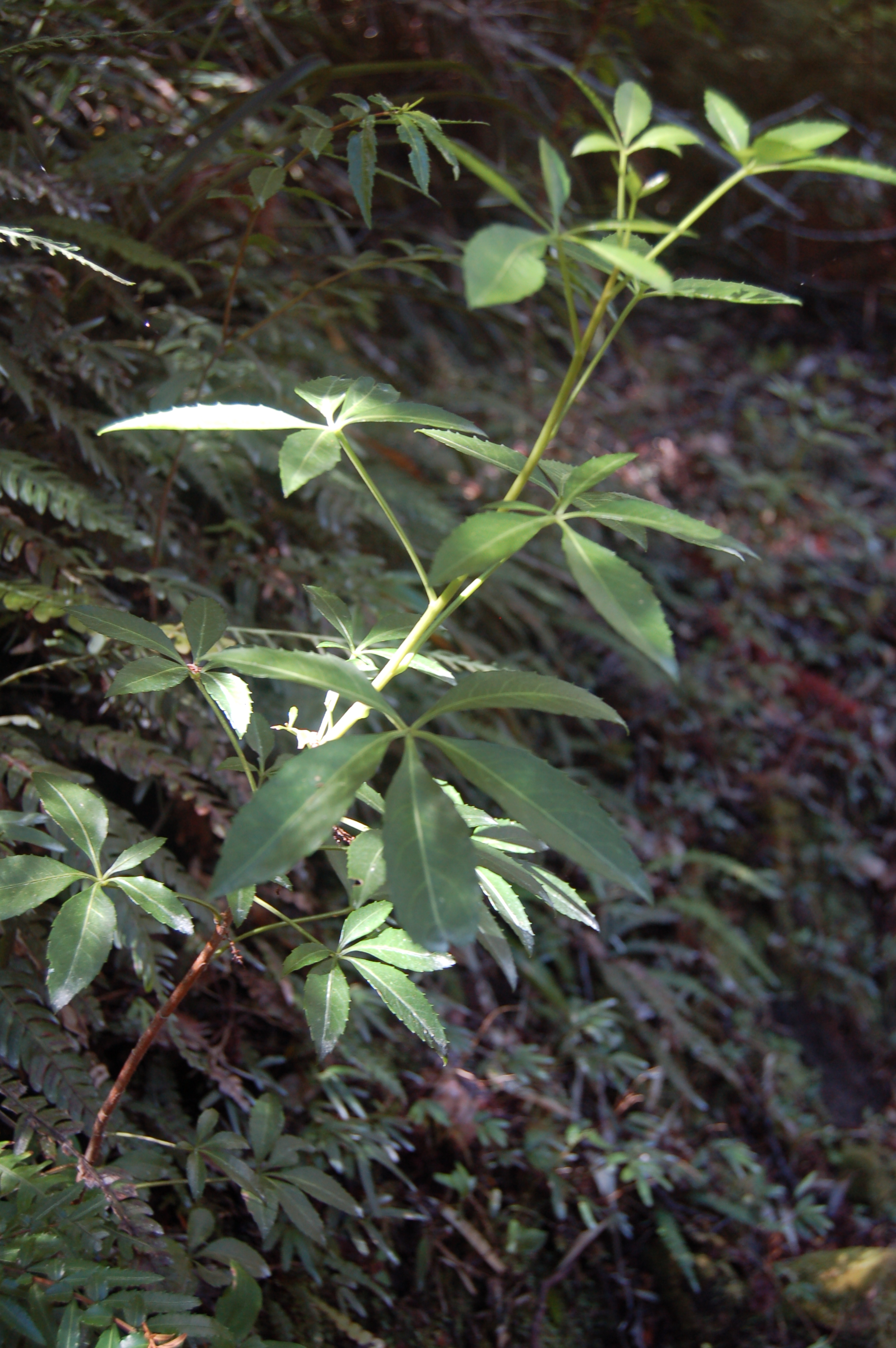
- Raukaua laetevirens

Scientific classification
- Kingdom: Plantae
- Clade: Tracheophytes
- Clade: Angiosperms
- Clade: Eudicots
- Clade: Asterids
- Order: Apiales
- Family: Araliaceae
- Subfamily: Aralioideae
- Genus: Raukaua; Seem.

Type species
- Raukaua edgerleyi (Hook.f.) Seem.

= Raukaua =

Genus of flowering plants

Raukaua is a genus of flowering plants in the family Araliaceae. It has an austral distribution, being indigenous to southern Argentina and Chile, as well as New Zealand and the island of Tasmania.

Raukaua is a genus of woody plants. They vary in habit: for example R. laetevirens is a small tree, while R. valdiviensis is a liana. Like most of Araliaceae, they have palmately compound leaves. The leaves are heteroblastic, that is, conspicuously different in form from juvenile to adult. R. simplex often produces root suckers and on these, the further the sucker is from the main shoot, the more juvenile the form of the leaves.

The Māori extracted an aromatic oil from the leaves of R. edgerleyi. The essential oils of the New Zealand species have been the subject of a phytochemical analysis.

All of the species of Raukaua have been placed in Pseudopanax at one time or another, and sometimes in other genera as well. Molecular phylogenetic comparisons of DNA sequences have shown that Raukaua is closely related to Schefflera sensu strictissimo, Cheirodendron, Motherwellia, and Cephalaralia (not Cephalaria!). It might not be as close to Pseudopanax as was once believed.

Raukaua is known to be polyphyletic and will eventually be revised, but in its current circumscription, it comprises six species. R. gunnii is endemic to Tasmania. R. laetevirens and R. valdiviensis are from southern Chile and Argentina, the latter being restricted to the Valdivian temperate rain forest. R. anomalus, R. edgerleyi, and R. simplex are from New Zealand. There are naturally occurring hybrids between R. simplex and the other two New Zealand species.

The type species for Raukaua is Raukaua edgerleyi.

== Species and hybrids ==
Species

- Raukaua anomalus (Hook.f.) A.D. Mitchell, Frodin & Heads – New Zealand
- Raukaua edgerleyi (Hook.f.) Seem. – New Zealand
- Raukaua gunnii (Hook.f.) Frodin – Tasmania
- Raukaua laetevirens (Gay) Frodin – Central and southern Chile and southwestern Argentina
- Raukaua simplex (G. Forster) A.D. Mitchell, Frodin & Heads – New Zealand and Auckland Island
- Raukaua valdiviensis (Gay) Frodin – Central Chile

Hybrids

- Raukaua × parvus (Kirk) Heenan – (R. anomalus × R. simplex var. simplex) – New Zealand
- Raukaua × serratus (Kirk) Heenan (R. edgerleyi × R. simplex var. simplex) – New Zealand

== History ==
The genus Raukaua was erected by Berthold Carl Seemann in 1866 in Journal of Botany, British and Foreign. The genus name is a Latinization of Raukawa, the Māori name for Raukaua edgerleyi. Upon publication, the name was misspelled as Raukana, complicating issues of priority and valid publication, but Seeman published a correction in 1868 that read "Raukaua, Seem., read always Raukaua.".

Subsequently, most authors did not recognize Seemann's genus, and they usually placed its species in other genera, usually Pseudopanax. In cases where Raukaua was accepted, it usually included only the New Zealand species.

Raukaua was last revised in 1997, in the New Zealand Journal of Botany. The status of the two hybrids was clarified in 1998. In 2003, a checklist and nomenclator was published for Araliaceae.

Phylogenetic studies of Araliaceae have indicated that Raukaua might be paraphyletic or polyphyletic. The polyphyly of Raukaua was confirmed and clarified in 2012, in a molecular phylogenetic study. The following relationships were resolved. The New Zealand species are sister to a clade consisting of Schefflera sensu strictissimo and Cheirodendron. Schefflera s.ss. is a Melanesian and Polynesian group. Cheirodendron is endemic to Hawaii. The South American species are sister to a clade comprising the Tasmanian R. gunnii and the monospecific mainland Australian genera Cephalaralia and Motherwellia. R. gunnii is sister to the clade [Cephalaralia + Motherwellia]. Because of the polyphyly of Raukaua, its South American and Tasmanian species must eventually be transferred to other genera. A treatment of Araliaceae has already been submitted for the book series entitled The Families and Genera of Vascular Plants.
