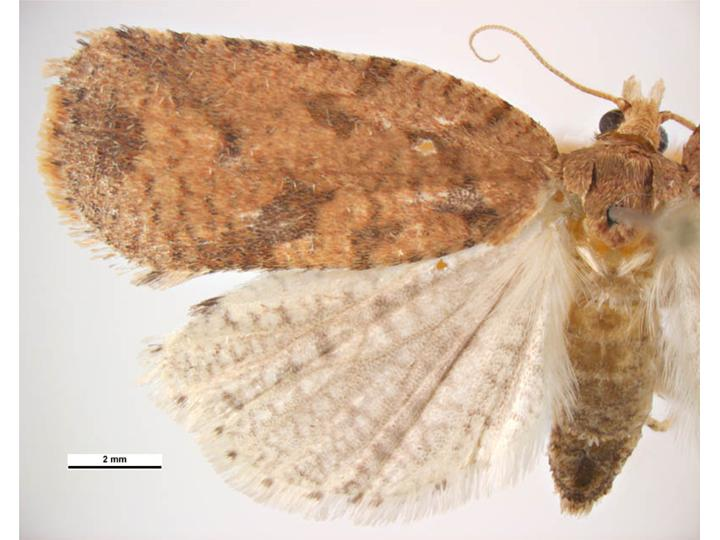
- Female
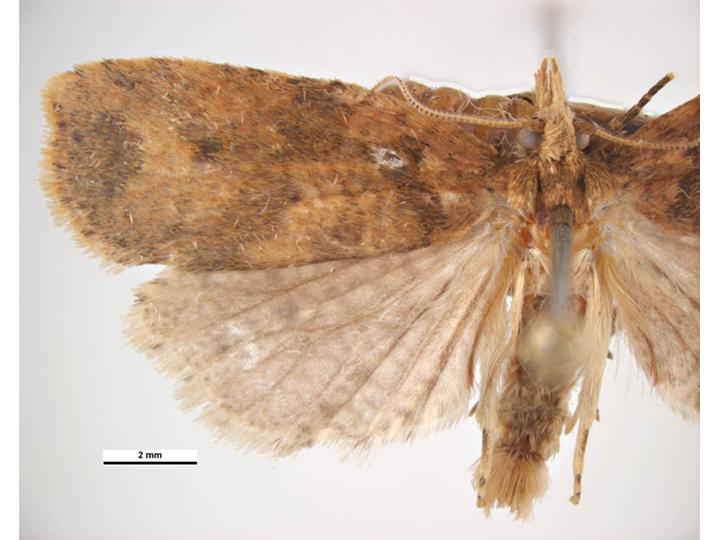
- Male

Scientific classification
- Domain: Eukaryota
- Kingdom: Animalia
- Phylum: Arthropoda
- Class: Insecta
- Order: Lepidoptera
- Family: Tortricidae
- Genus: Ctenopseustis
- Species: C. herana

Binomial name
- Ctenopseustis herana (Felder & Rogenhofer, 1875)

Synonyms
- Tortrix herana Felder & Rogenhofer, 1875; Cacoecia inana Butler, 1877

= Ctenopseustis herana =

Species of moth

Ctenopseustis herana, the brownheaded leafroller, is a moth of the family Tortricidae. It is native to New Zealand, where it is found on the South, Stewart and Chatham islands. The common name is also used for related species Ctenopseustis obliquana and Ctenopseustis fraterna.

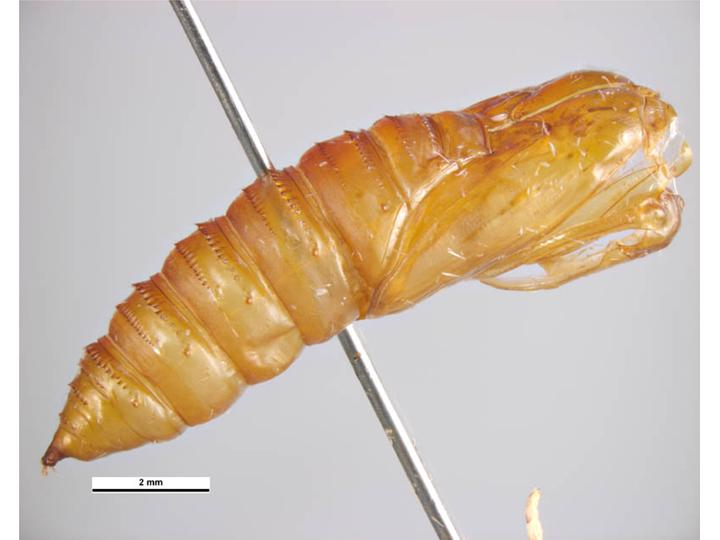
Pupa, female

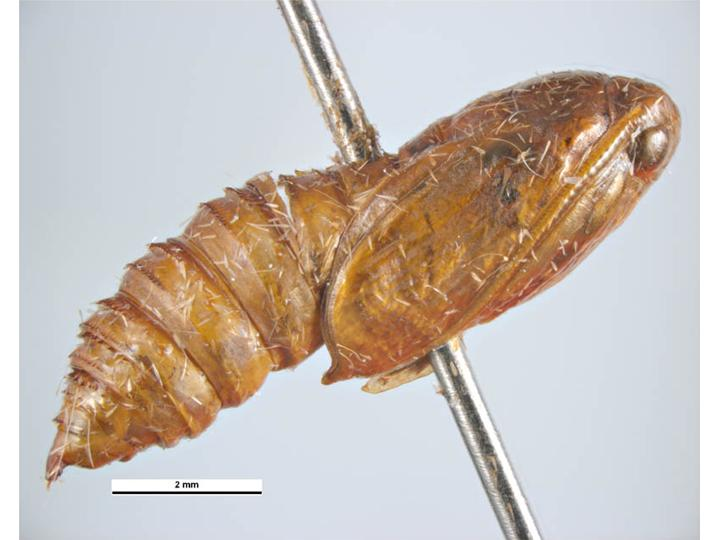
Pupa, male

The wingspan is 20–28 mm.
