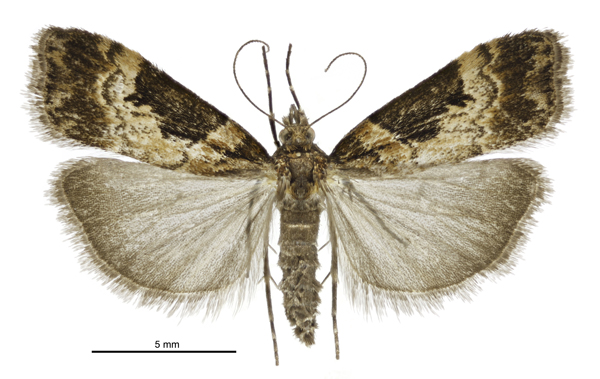
- Female
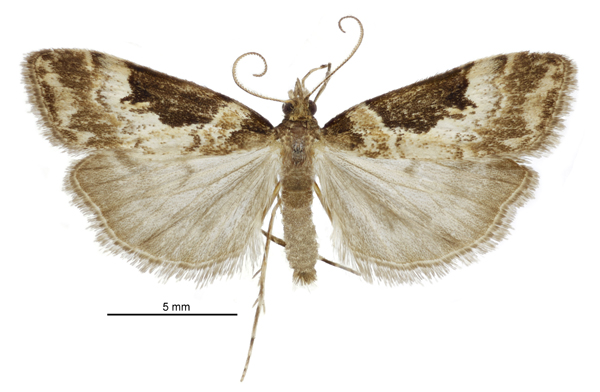
- Male

Scientific classification
- Kingdom: Animalia
- Phylum: Arthropoda
- Class: Insecta
- Order: Lepidoptera
- Family: Crambidae
- Genus: Scoparia
- Species: S. parmifera

Binomial name
- Scoparia parmifera Meyrick, 1909

= Scoparia parmifera =

Species of moth

Scoparia parmifera is a moth in the family Crambidae. It was described by Edward Meyrick in 1909. It is endemic to New Zealand.
