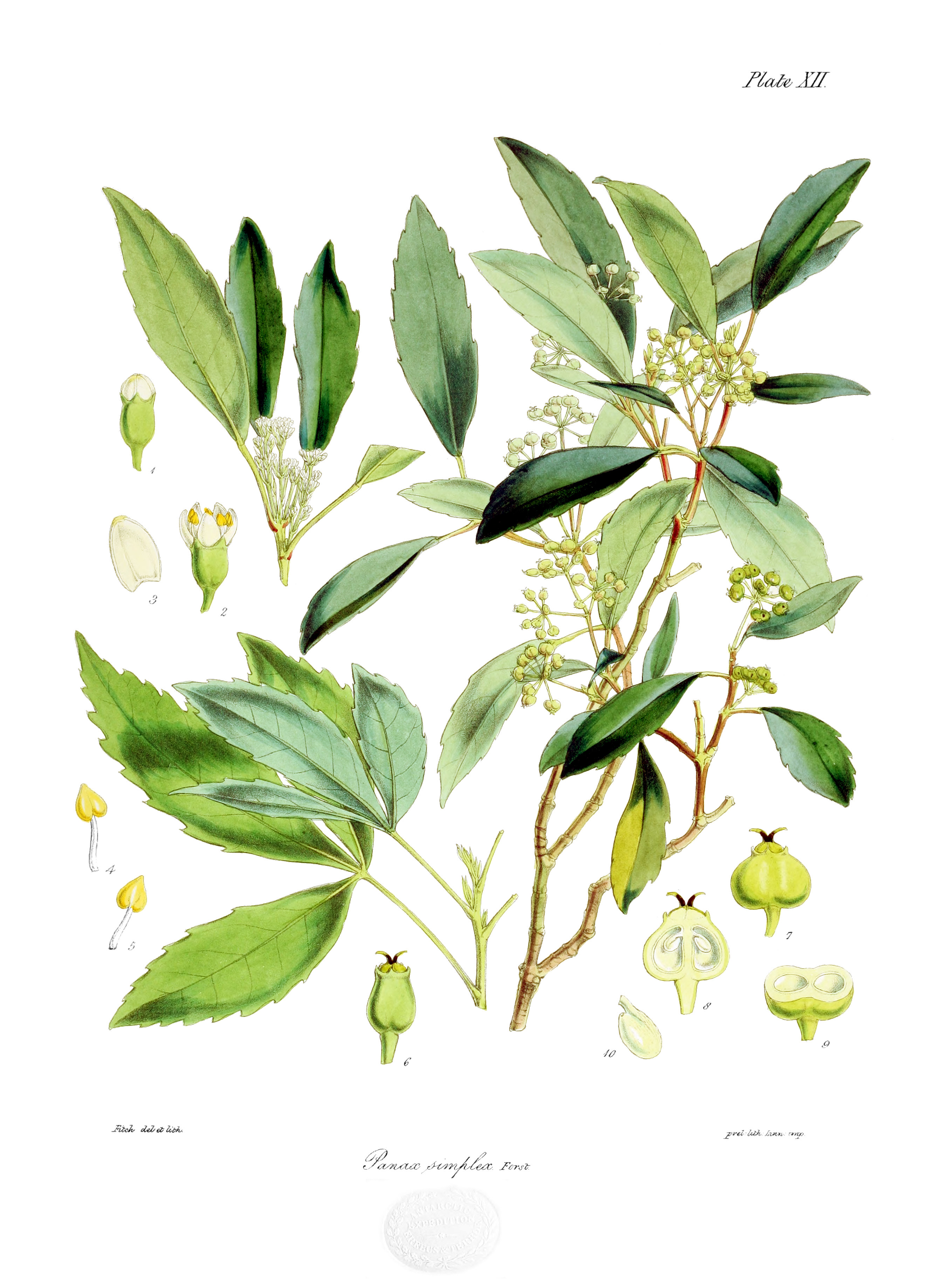
- Raukaua simplex (artist W.H.Fitch)
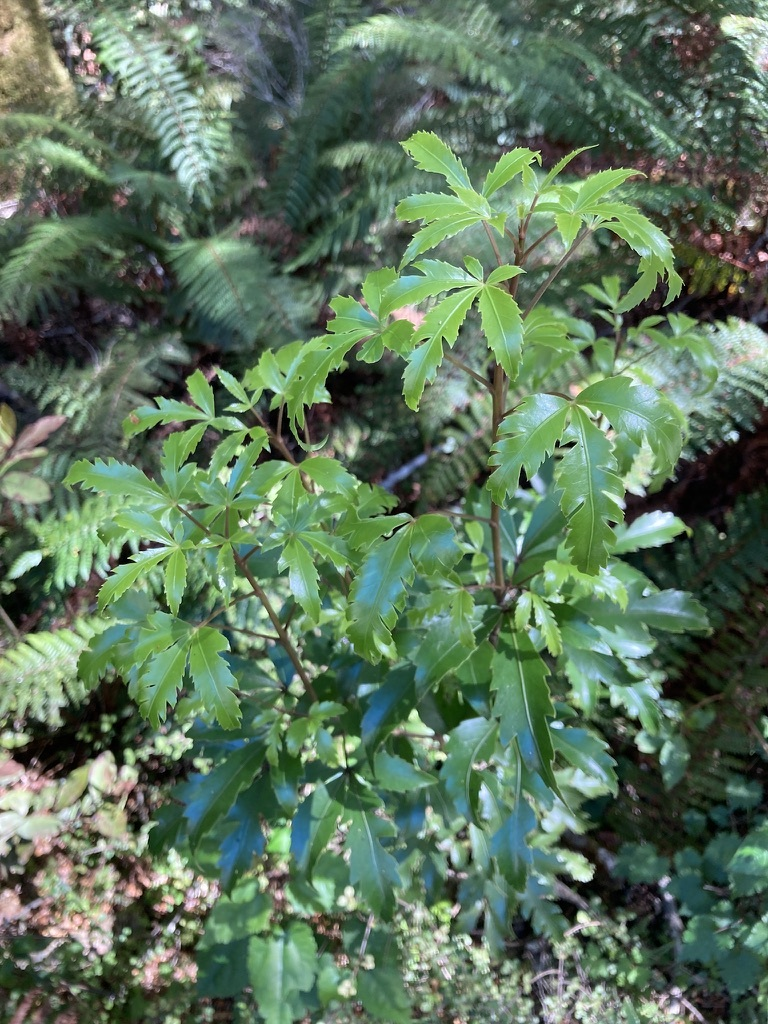

Scientific classification
- Kingdom: Plantae
- Clade: Tracheophytes
- Clade: Angiosperms
- Clade: Eudicots
- Clade: Asterids
- Order: Apiales
- Family: Araliaceae
- Genus: Raukaua
- Species: R. simplex

Binomial name
- Raukaua simplex (G.Forst.) A.D.Mitch., Frodin & Heads

Synonyms
- Panax simplex G.Forst. Pseudopanax simplex (G.Forst.) K.Koch; Nothopanax simplex (G.Forst.); Neopanax simplex (G.Forst.) Allan; Pseudopanax simplex (G.Forst.) Philipson nom. illeg.

= Raukaua simplex =

Species of flowering plant

Raukaua simplex, commonly known as haumakāroa, is a species of evergreen plant in the Araliaceae family. This species is native to New Zealand. The species occurs in certain lowland, montane and subalpine forests from the Waihou River southward to Stewart Island and the Auckland Islands. An example occurrence in Westland forests includes associates such as Cyathea smithii and Dicksonia squarrosa.

== Description ==
Raukaua simplex grows as a shrub to small tree up to 8m in height.

The species exhibits a significant change in appearance (heteroblasty) between its juvenile and adult form. Juvenile leaves are palmately compound, 3-5 leaflets, and deeply lobed. Adult leaves are simple, with toothed margins.

== Taxonomy ==
Raukaua simplex was first described in 1786 by Georg Forster as Panax simplex in Florulae Insularum Australium Prodromus. In 1997, Mitchell, Frodin and Heads redescribed it, assigning it to the genus, Raukaua, thus naming it Raukaua simplex.
