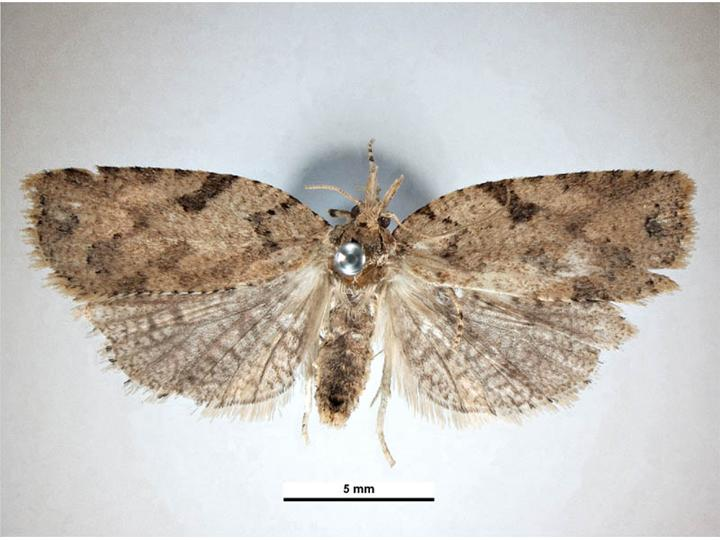
- Female
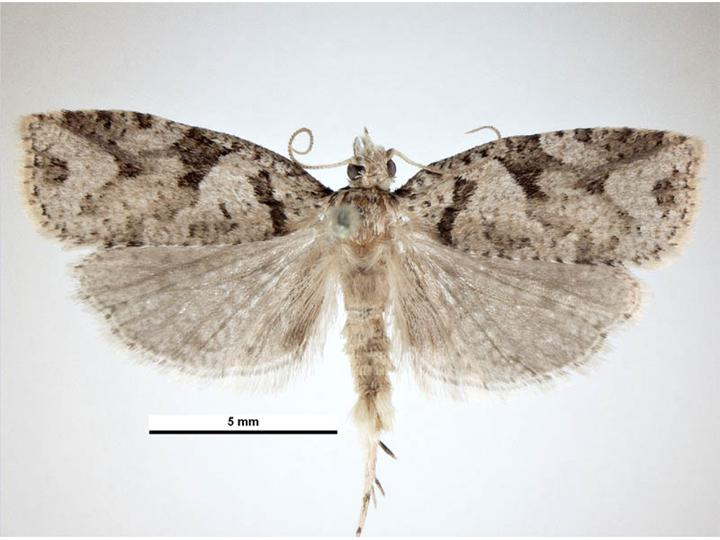
- Male

Scientific classification
- Kingdom: Animalia
- Phylum: Arthropoda
- Class: Insecta
- Order: Lepidoptera
- Family: Tortricidae
- Genus: Ctenopseustis
- Species: C. obliquana

Binomial name
- Ctenopseustis obliquana (Walker, 1863)

Synonyms
- Teras obliquana Walker, 1863; Cacoecia charactana Meyrick, 1881; Tortrix ropeana Felder & Rogenhofer, 1875; Teras spurcatana Walker, 1863; Sciaphila transtrigana Walker, 1863; Sciaphila turbulentana Walker, 1863

= Ctenopseustis obliquana =

Species of moth

Ctenopseustis obliquana, the brownheaded leafroller, is a moth of the family Tortricidae. This species was first described by Francis Walker in 1863. It is indigenous to New Zealand and is a possible introduced species in Hawaii.

== Taxonomy ==
This species was first described by Francis Walker in 1863 and named Teras obliquana. George Hudson discussed and illustrated this species in his 1928 book The butterflies and moths of New Zealand under that name. The common name is also used for the related species Ctenopseustis herana and Ctenopseustis fraterna.

== Description ==
The wingspan can range up to 25 mm.

== Distribution ==
It is indigenous to New Zealand and may be an introduced species in Hawaii.

== Human interaction ==
This species is regarded as a forestry pest. Larvae feed from a protective nest of silk and plant debris on the leaves, stem and buds of host plants.
