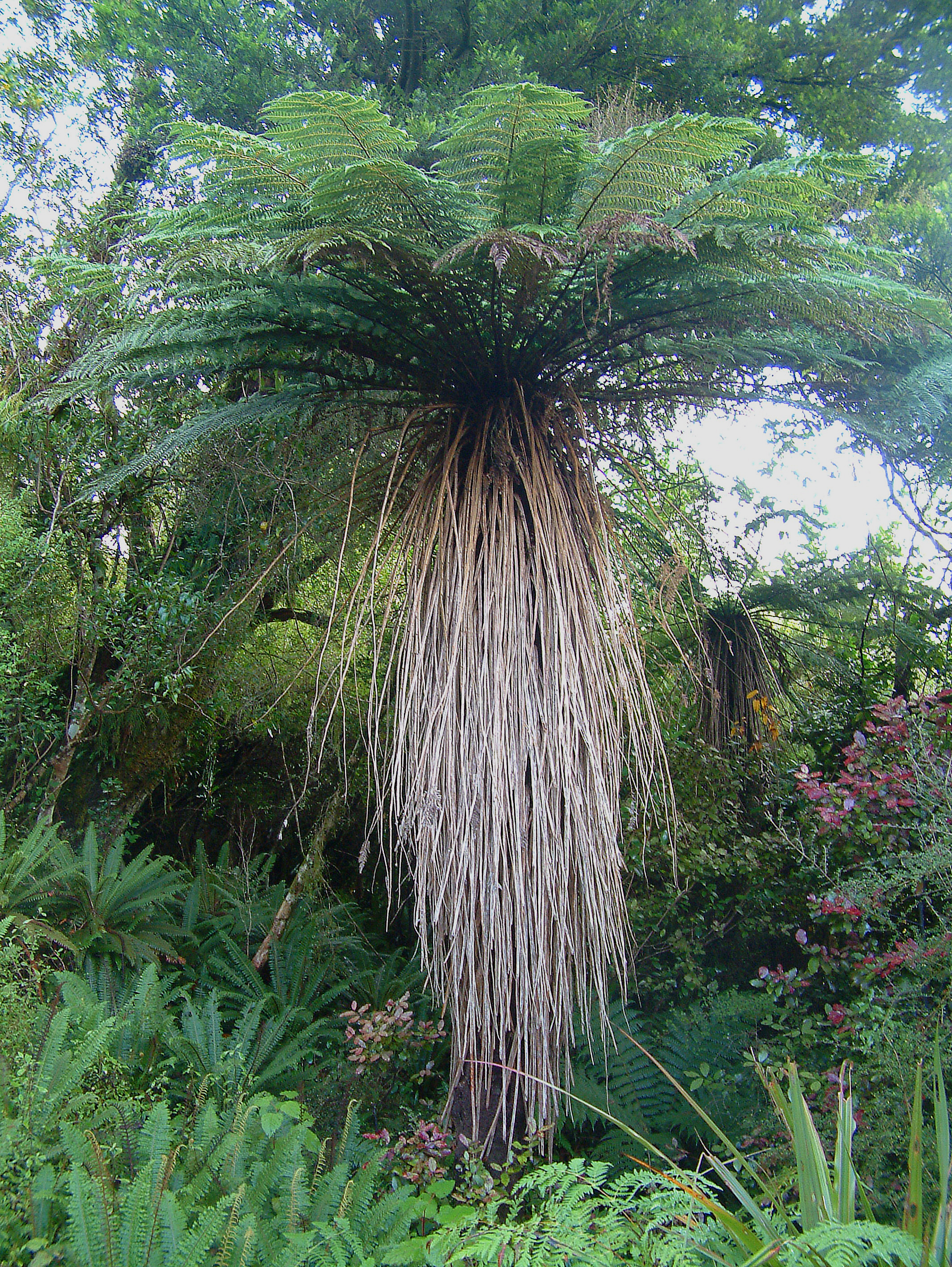
- Whole tree

Scientific classification
- Kingdom: Plantae
- Clade: Tracheophytes
- Division: Polypodiophyta
- Class: Polypodiopsida
- Order: Cyatheales
- Family: Cyatheaceae
- Genus: Alsophila
- Species: A. smithii

Binomial name
- Alsophila smithii (Hook.f.) R.M.Tryon

Synonyms
- Cyathea smithii Hook.f.; Cyathea novae-zelandiae Domin; Hemitelia microphylla Colenso; Hemitelia smithii (Hook.f.) Hook; Hemitelia stellulata Colenso

= Alsophila smithii =

Species of fern

Alsophila smithii, synonym Cyathea smithii, commonly known as the soft tree fern or kātote, is a species of tree fern from New Zealand.

== Distribution and ecology ==
The species' natural distribution covers all major islands of New Zealand: the North and South Islands, Stewart Island / Rakiura, the Chatham Islands, and south to the Auckland Islands. It is common in montane forest, with populations from the southern regions of its range growing in lowland forest. In the Westland forests of South Island, A. smithii occurs in the understory of certain broadleaf/podocarp forests.

== Description ==
A. smithii is an understory tree fern that grows up to 8 m tall but tends not reaching into the canopy as do other iconic members of this genus. It grows slowly and is not a strong competitor except at higher altitudes. Like related tree ferns, it has rough scales along its rachis and trunk. A distinctive feature is the retention of dead fronds as a skirt. The skirt is not the whole frond, only the central rachis, making it a more compact skirt than that of Dicksonia fibrosa, another skirt clad tree fern.

Alsophila smithii produces masses of very soft and delicate looking fronds which spread horizontally from the crown and reach 2–2.5 m in length.

== Cultivation ==
Alsophila smithii suffers in exposure to wind, sun and frost and is prone to drying out, but can be grown successfully in sheltered areas.

== Uses ==
The pith was traditionally used as a starch source, but as it is rich in resin, it would likely be a food of last resort or at least an acquired taste. Tree fern trunks have been used as rough building material, fencing, and makeshift trackwork.

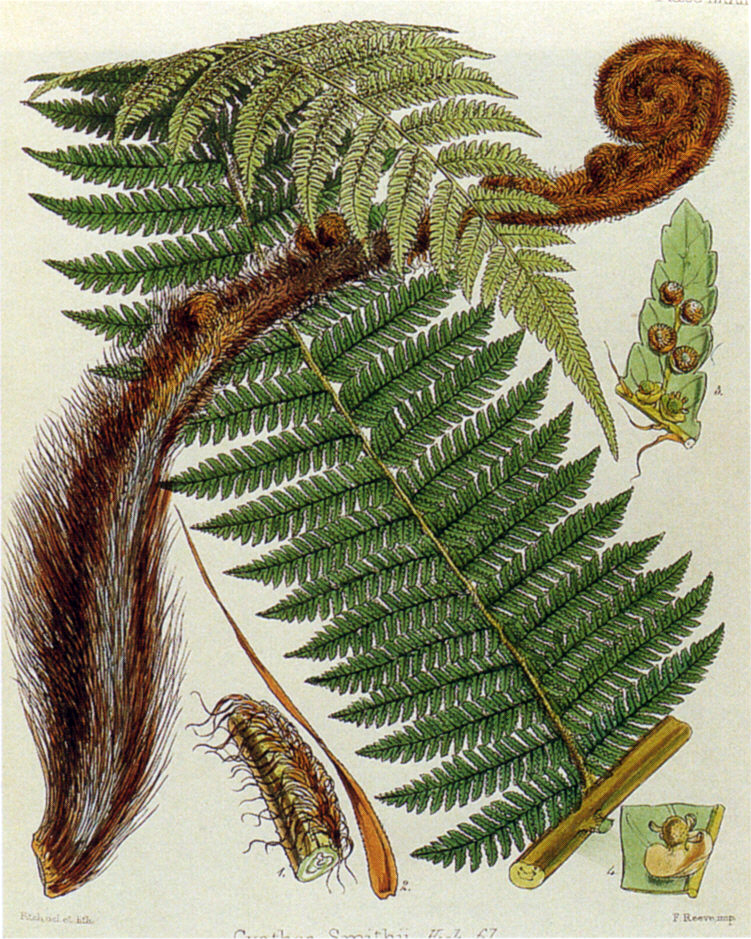
Illustration from The Botany of the Antarctic Voyage of H.M. Discovery Ships Erebus and Terror

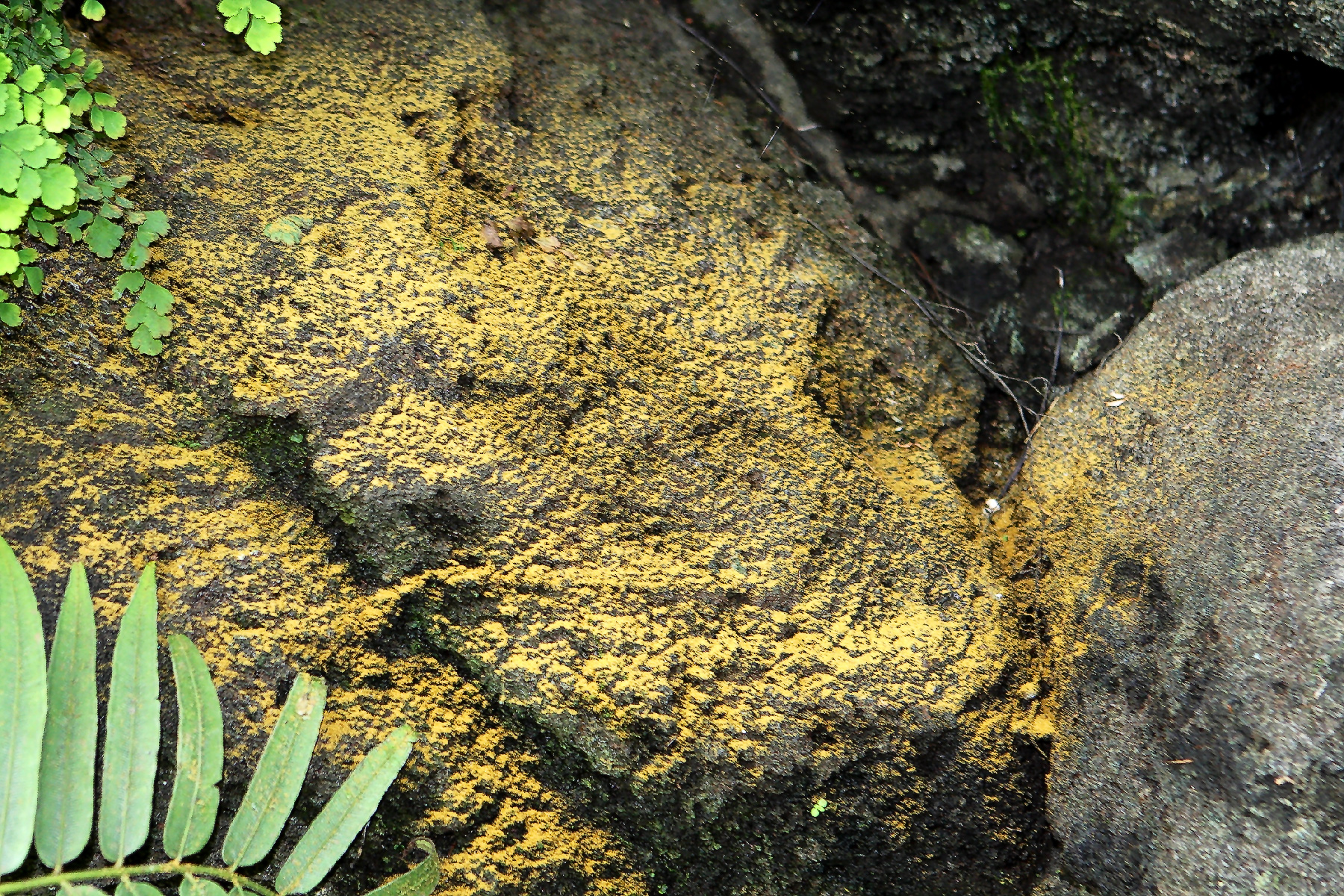
Showing spores

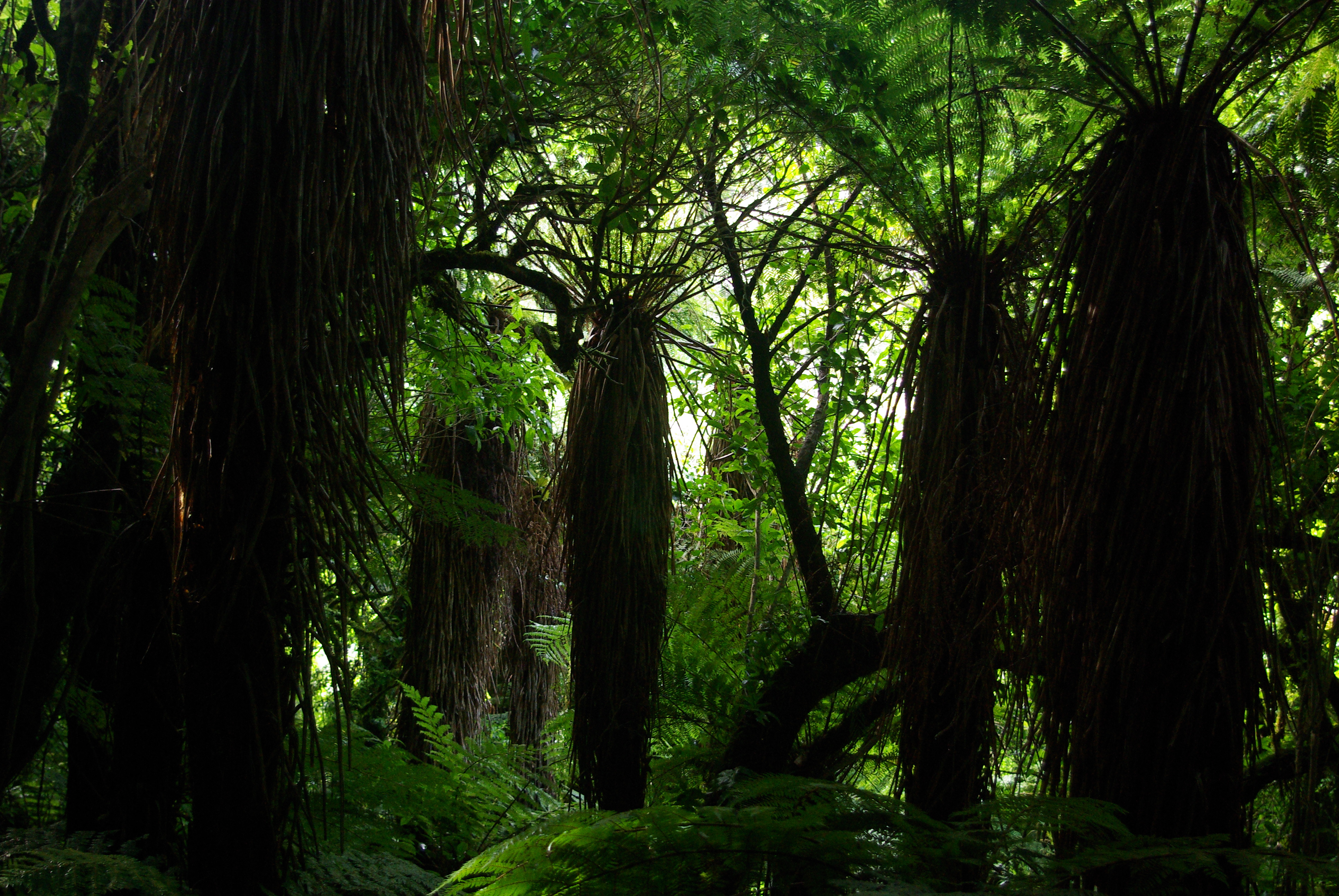
Habitat and distinctive skirts
