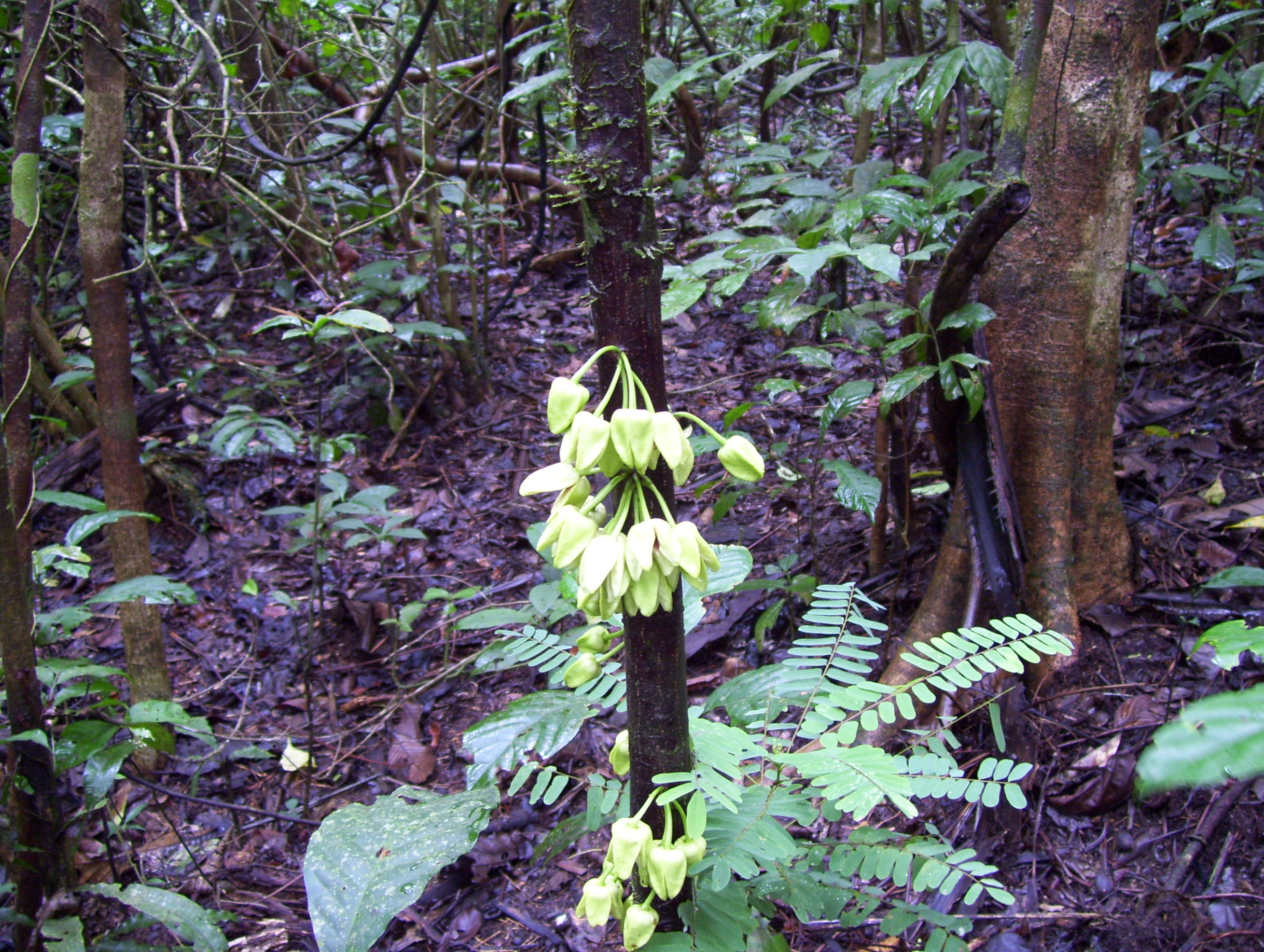
- Cauliflorous inflorescences on trunk
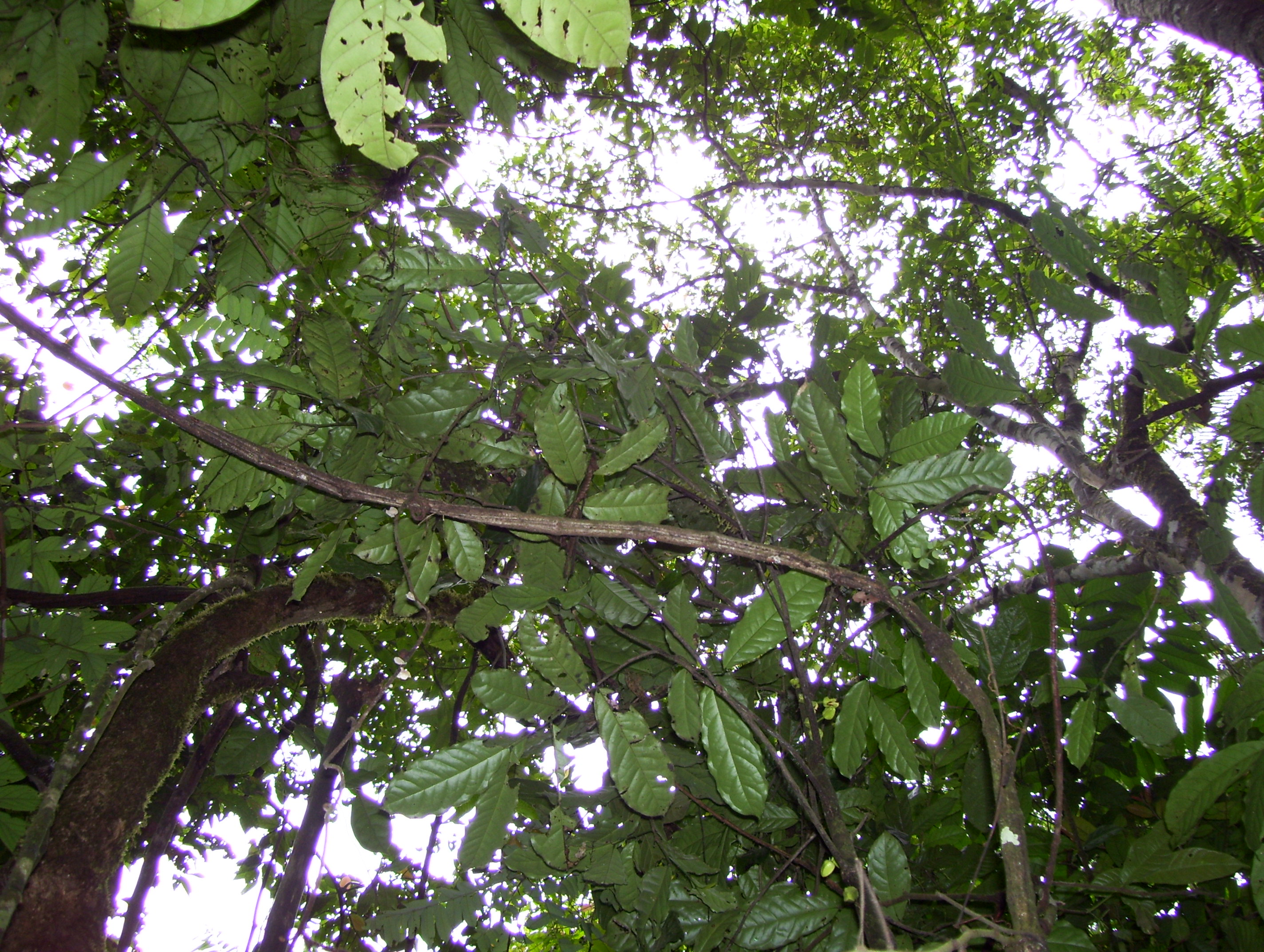
- Trunk apex with cauliflorous flowers and canopy

Conservation status
- Critically Endangered (IUCN 3.1)

Scientific classification
- Kingdom: Plantae
- Clade: Embryophytes
- Clade: Tracheophytes
- Clade: Spermatophytes
- Clade: Angiosperms
- Clade: Magnoliids
- Order: Magnoliales
- Family: Annonaceae
- Genus: Uvariopsis
- Species: U. dicaprio

Binomial name
- Uvariopsis dicaprio Cheek & Gosline [wd]
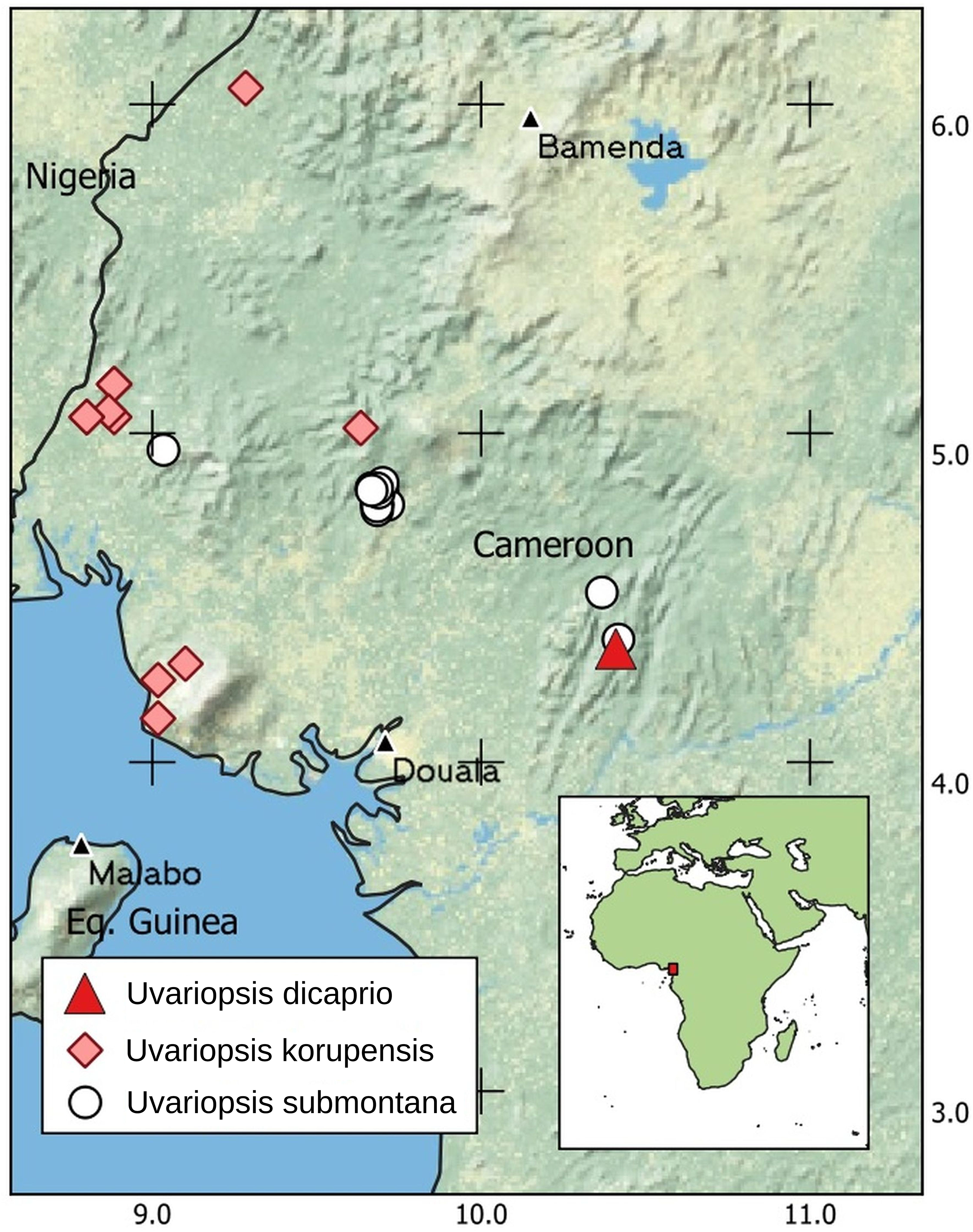
- Global distribution of U. dicaprio, along with U. korupensis and U. submontana

Synonyms
- Uvariopsis ebo nom. nud.

= Uvariopsis dicaprio =

Species of tropical evergreen tree

Uvariopsis dicaprio is a species of tropical evergreen tree in the genus Uvariopsis. It is endemic to the Ebo Forest, in the Littoral Region of Cameroon. It was the first new plant species described in 2022, and was named after American actor Leonardo DiCaprio by botanists Martin Cheek and George Gosline, from the Royal Botanic Gardens, Kew. U. dicaprio is classified as Critically Endangered in the IUCN Red List.

== Description ==
Uvariopsis dicaprio is an evergreen tree reaching 3–4 metres (9.8–13.1 ft) tall. Its trunk is smooth and tapering, reaching a diameter of "1.8–2.5 cm … at 1.5 m above the ground", with dark brown bark and occasional white horizontal lenticels.

Its leaves are oblanceolate, and are typically 17.7–20.3 cm long (but sometimes as long as 23 cm) and typically 7–7.9 cm wide (but sometimes only 6.4 cm wide). They are hairless, and coloured "pale yellow-green" but later turn "orangish brown". Their arrangement is distichous, and they are typically spaced 1.5–2.8 cm apart (but are sometimes as close as 1.2 cm or as far as 4.3 cm).

The specimen collected had only male flowers, but Gosline & Cheek et al. hypothesise that U. dicaprio is monoecious, with separate male and female flowers. Its male flowers are cauliflorous, growing directly from the stem, and glossy. Their pedicels, which connect the flower to the stem, are 1.8–2.5 cm long and about 1 mm in diameter. Each flower has two sepals and four petals. The sepals are 1–1.5 by 2.1–2.5 mm and hairless. The petals are typically about 16 by 9 mm (but sometimes as small as 14 by 5.5 mm), and 0.25–0.3 mm thick; they are thin and leathery but not fleshy, and are "yellow-green when live" but black when dried. There are typically 4–7 flowers in each inflorescence (but sometimes as few as 1). It has similar conical flower buds to Uvariopsis solheidii, which can vary from ovoid-conical to pyramidal.

== Habitat and range ==
Uvariopsis dicaprio is endemic to the Ebo Forest, in the Littoral Region of Cameroon. It has a limited range, having only been found on the Dicam trail 2000 meters away from Bekob camp; multiple botanical surveys in the Ebo Forest and surrounding areas have not identified any additional specimens. It is found in the submontane forest, at elevations from 200 to 1,200 m.

== Conservation status ==
Uvariopsis dicaprio is currently known from a single specimen; "fewer than 50 mature individuals have been observed despite extensive survey effort" and the species's noticeable flowers. It has a restricted range, with extent of occurrence and area of occupancy both estimated at 4 km^{2} (1.5 mi^{2}), and is threatened by logging and conversion to agricultural land, including slash-and-burn practices. Due to these factors, U. dicaprio was classified as Critically Endangered under version 3.1 of the IUCN Red List criteria.
