= D. elegantissima =

D. elegantissima may refer to:

- Daphnella elegantissima, a sea snail species
- Dizygotheca elegantissima, a synonym for Plerandra elegantissima, the false aralia, a plant species native to New Caledonia
