= Plerandra nono =

Scientific classification
- Kingdom: Plantae
- Clade: Tracheophytes
- Clade: Angiosperms
- Clade: Eudicots
- Clade: Asterids
- Order: Apiales
- Family: Araliaceae
- Genus: Plerandra
- Species: P. nono

Binomial name
- Plerandra nono (Baill.) Lowry, G.M.Plunkett & Frodin

Synonyms
- Schefflera nono Baill., 1878

Species of flowering plant

Plerandra nono is a species of flowering plant in the family Araliaceae. It is endemic to New Caledonia.
