= Uvariopsis pedunculosa =

Conservation status
- Vulnerable (IUCN 3.1)

Scientific classification
- Kingdom: Plantae
- Clade: Embryophytes
- Clade: Tracheophytes
- Clade: Spermatophytes
- Clade: Angiosperms
- Clade: Magnoliids
- Order: Magnoliales
- Family: Annonaceae
- Genus: Uvariopsis
- Species: U. pedunculosa

Binomial name
- Uvariopsis pedunculosa (Diels) Robyns & Ghesq.

Synonyms
- Tetrastemma pedunculosum Diels; Uvariopsis vanderystii Robyns & Ghesq.

Species of flowering plant

Uvariopsis pedunculosa is a species of flowering plant in the custard apple family Annonaceae. It is a tree native to Cameroon, the Democratic Republic of the Congo, mainland Equatorial Guinea, and Gabon. Its natural habitat is subtropical or tropical moist lowland forests. It is threatened by habitat loss.

== Description ==
Uvariopsis pedunculosa is a monoecious shrub, meaning that flowers are either male or female, and both types are present on each plant. The inflorescences occur on the trunk. Its petals are joined at the base, with flowers having distinct pedicels.

== Taxonomy ==
Uvariopsis pedunculosa was first described as Tetrastemma pedunculosum by Ludwig Diels in 1915. In 1933 Frans Hubert Edouard Arthur Walter Robyns and Jean Hector Paul Auguste Ghesquière placed the species in genus Uvariopsis as U. pedunculosa.
