= Isolona =

Scientific classification
- Kingdom: Plantae
- Clade: Embryophytes
- Clade: Tracheophytes
- Clade: Spermatophytes
- Clade: Angiosperms
- Clade: Magnoliids
- Order: Magnoliales
- Family: Annonaceae
- Tribe: Monodoreae
- Genus: Isolona; Engl.

Genus of flowering plants

Isolona is a genus of flowering plants in the family Annonaceae. There are 20 species native to tropical Africa. They occur in humid habitat types.

== Species ==
20 species are accepted.

- Isolona campanulata Engl. & Diels
- Isolona capuronii Cavaco & Keraudren
- Isolona cauliflora Verdc.
- Isolona congolana (De Wild. & T. Durand) Engl. & Diels
- Isolona cooperi Hutch. & Dalziel ex G.P.Cooper & Record
- Isolona deightonii Keay
- Isolona dewevrei (De Wild. & T.Durand) Engl. & Diels
- Isolona ghesquierei Cavaco & Keraudren
- Isolona heinsenii Engl. & Diels
- Isolona hexaloba (Pierre) Engl. & Diels
- Isolona humbertiana Ghesq. ex Cavaco & Keraudr.
- Isolona lebrunii Boutique
- Isolona letestui Pellegr.
- Isolona linearis Couvreur
- Isolona madagascariensis (A.DC.) Engl.
- Isolona perrieri Diels
- Isolona pilosa Diels
- Isolona pleurocarpa Diels
- Isolona thonneri (De Wild. & T.Durand) Engl. & Diels
- Isolona zenkeri Engl.
