= Isolona zenkeri =

Conservation status
- Least Concern (IUCN 3.1)

Scientific classification
- Kingdom: Plantae
- Clade: Embryophytes
- Clade: Tracheophytes
- Clade: Spermatophytes
- Clade: Angiosperms
- Clade: Magnoliids
- Order: Magnoliales
- Family: Annonaceae
- Genus: Isolona
- Species: I. zenkeri

Binomial name
- Isolona zenkeri Engl.

Synonyms
- Diospyros oblongicarpa Gürke; Maba oblongicarpa (Gürke) Prain

Species of flowering plant

Isolona zenkeri is a species of plant in the Annonaceae family. It is found in Cameroon, The Republic of the Congo and Gabon. Adolf Engler, the German botanist who first formally described the species, named it after Georg August Zenker who collected the sample Engler examined. Its natural habitat is subtropical or tropical moist lowland forests. It is threatened by habitat loss.

== Description ==
It has dark smooth branches. Its leaves are 20–25 by 7-9 centimeters and come to a point at their tip.
