= Neocussonia vantsilana =

Scientific classification
- Kingdom: Plantae
- Clade: Tracheophytes
- Clade: Angiosperms
- Clade: Eudicots
- Clade: Asterids
- Order: Apiales
- Family: Araliaceae
- Genus: Neocussonia
- Species: N. vantsilana

Binomial name
- Neocussonia vantsilana (Baker) Lowry, G.M.Plunkett, Gostel & Frodin

Species of flowering plant

Neocussonia vantsilana is a species of flowering plant endemic to Madagascar.
