= Zenkerella =

Zenkerella may refer to:

- Zenkerella, a monotypic genus of rodents in the family Anomaluridae with the only species Zenkerella insignis
- Zenkerella (plant), a legume genus
