= Plerandra veitchii =

Conservation status
- Vulnerable (IUCN 3.1)

Scientific classification
- Kingdom: Plantae
- Clade: Tracheophytes
- Clade: Angiosperms
- Clade: Eudicots
- Clade: Asterids
- Order: Apiales
- Family: Araliaceae
- Genus: Plerandra
- Species: P. veitchii

Binomial name
- Plerandra veitchii (Carrière) Lowry, G.M.Plunkett & Frodin

Synonyms
- Aralia gracillima Linden; Aralia handsworthensis Fisch. & Sibray; Aralia parvifolia Pancher & Sebert; Aralia tenuifolia Pancher ex Baill.; Aralia veitchii Carrière; Dizygotheca apioidea (Baill.) R.Vig.; Dizygotheca parvifolia (Pancher & Sebert) R.Vig.; Dizygotheca tenuifolia (Pancher ex Baill.) R.Vig.; Schefflera apioidea Baill.; Schefflera parvifolia (Pancher & Sebert) Baill.; Schefflera veitchii (Carrière) Frodin & Lowry

Species of flowering plant

Plerandra veitchii is a species of plant in the family Araliaceae. It is endemic to New Caledonia. It is threatened by habitat loss.
