= Crepinella acaropunctata =

Conservation status
- Vulnerable (IUCN 3.1)

Scientific classification
- Kingdom: Plantae
- Clade: Tracheophytes
- Clade: Angiosperms
- Clade: Eudicots
- Clade: Asterids
- Order: Apiales
- Family: Araliaceae
- Genus: Crepinella
- Species: C. acaropunctata

Binomial name
- Crepinella acaropunctata (Frodin) Lowry, G.M.Plunkett & D.A.Neill (2019)

Synonyms
- Schefflera acaropunctata Frodin (1993); Schefflera umbellata subsp. duidana Maguire, Steyerm. & Frodin (1984)

Species of flowering plant

Crepinella acaropunctata is a flowering plant in the family Araliaceae. It is endemic to the tepuis Cerro Duida and Cerro Marahuaca in Duida–Marahuaca National Park of Amazonas state of southern Venezuela.

It grows in montane forest from 1,600 to 2,700 meters elevation. It is found in shrub islands in open and often rocky places, on forested slopes, and along creeks.
