= Neocussonia lukwangulensis =

Conservation status
- Endangered (IUCN 3.1)

Scientific classification
- Kingdom: Plantae
- Clade: Tracheophytes
- Clade: Angiosperms
- Clade: Eudicots
- Clade: Asterids
- Order: Apiales
- Family: Araliaceae
- Genus: Neocussonia
- Species: N. lukwangulensis

Binomial name
- Neocussonia lukwangulensis (Tennant) Lowry, G.M.Plunkett, Gostel & Frodin (2017)

Synonyms
- Cussonia lukwangulensis Tennant (1960); Schefflera lukwangulensis (Tennant) Bernardi (1969)

Species of flowering plant

Neocussonia lukwangulensis is a species of plant in the family Araliaceae. It is endemic to the Eastern Arc Mountains of Tanzania. It is typically a freestanding tree, and uncommonly an epiphyte.

It is found in the South Pare Uluguru, Udzungwa, and Rubeho mountains, and the Mpanga-Kipengere Game Reserve in the Kipengere Range.

It grows in montane rain forest and shrubland on steep slopes and rocky ridges from 1,350 to 2,360 metres elevation. Habitats include Allanblackia-Podocarpus-Balthasaria-Zenkerella-Cussonia forest, riverine forest, with Dodonaea and Myrica merging into Kuloa usambarensis forest, on dry slopes covered with bracken ferns, on granitic rocks covered by evergreen heath or bush, and in high-elevation elfin forest with species of Erica, Agauria, Myrica, Tecomaria, Syzygium, and Podocarpus.
