= Uvariopsis zenkeri =

Conservation status
- Vulnerable (IUCN 3.1)

Scientific classification
- Kingdom: Plantae
- Clade: Embryophytes
- Clade: Tracheophytes
- Clade: Spermatophytes
- Clade: Angiosperms
- Clade: Magnoliids
- Order: Magnoliales
- Family: Annonaceae
- Genus: Uvariopsis
- Species: U. zenkeri

Binomial name
- Uvariopsis zenkeri Engl.

Species of shrub

Uvariopsis zenkeri Engl. is a species of flowering shrub in the family Annonaceae endemic to Cameroon and the Central African Republic.

== Description ==
Uvariopsis zenkeri is a shrub of 1–4 m high and bears its monoecious inflorescences on the old wood of both its branches and its trunk. Its petals are joined at the base of the flower.

== Etymology ==
The specific epithet zenkeri honours the German botanist Georg August Zenker, who discovered the first specimen at Bipindi in the Cameroons in 1896.

== Distribution ==
This species is found in shadow on laterite at an elevation of 120 m in Cameroon, and in the fringing forest of the rain-forest in the Central African Republic. IUCN, however, lists this species as endemic to Cameroon.

== Taxonomy ==
This plant was first described by Engler in 1899, and is the type species of Uvariopsis.
