= Plerandra seemanniana =

Conservation status
- Least Concern (IUCN 2.3)

Scientific classification
- Kingdom: Plantae
- Clade: Tracheophytes
- Clade: Angiosperms
- Clade: Eudicots
- Clade: Asterids
- Order: Apiales
- Family: Araliaceae
- Genus: Plerandra
- Species: P. seemanniana

Binomial name
- Plerandra seemanniana (A.C.Sm.) G.M.Plunkett, Lowry & Frodin (2013)

Synonyms
- Agalma vitiense Seem. (1866); Schefflera seemanniana A.C.Sm. (1936)

Species of flowering plant

Plerandra seemanniana is a species of plant in the family Araliaceae. It is a tree endemic to the island of Viti Levu in Fiji.
