= Crepinella spruceana =

Scientific classification
- Kingdom: Plantae
- Clade: Tracheophytes
- Clade: Angiosperms
- Clade: Eudicots
- Clade: Asterids
- Order: Apiales
- Family: Araliaceae
- Genus: Crepinella
- Species: C. spruceana

Binomial name
- Crepinella spruceana (Seem.) G.M.Plunkett, Lowry & D.A.Neill (2019)

Synonyms
- Didymopanax spruceanus Seem. (1868); Didymopanax spruceanus var. cuyabaensis Hoehne (1915); Schefflera spruceana (Seem.) Maguire, Steyerm. & Frodin (1984)

Species of flowering plant

Crepinella spruceana is a species of flowering plant in the family Araliaceae. It is a tree endemic to Brazil, Colombia, and Venezuela.
