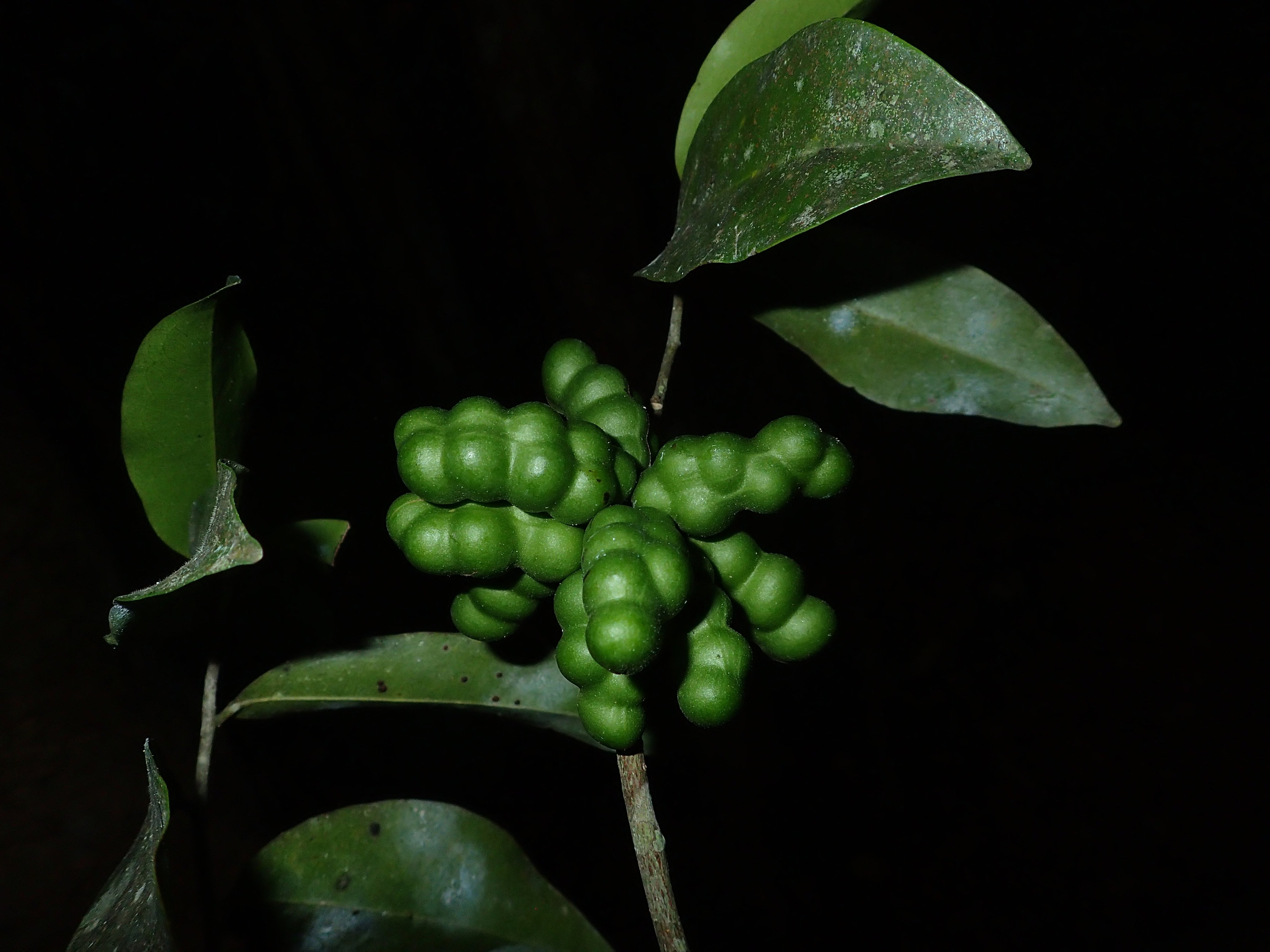
- Photograph of Uvariopsis congensis with fruit.

Conservation status
- Least Concern (IUCN 3.1)

Scientific classification
- Kingdom: Plantae
- Clade: Embryophytes
- Clade: Tracheophytes
- Clade: Spermatophytes
- Clade: Angiosperms
- Clade: Magnoliids
- Order: Magnoliales
- Family: Annonaceae
- Genus: Uvariopsis
- Species: U. congensis

Binomial name
- Uvariopsis congensis Robyns & Ghesq.

= Uvariopsis congensis =

Species of flowering plant

Uvariopsis congensis is a species of plant in the Annonaceae family. It is native to Angola, Cameroon, the Central African Republic, the Democratic Republic of the Congo, Gabon, Ivory Coast, Kenya, Sudan, Uganda, Zambia. Walter Robyns and Jean Ghesquière, the botanists who first formally described the species, named it after the Belgian Congo, now called the Democratic Republic of the Congo, where the specimen they examined was collected in the town of Kisantu near the Inkisi River.

== Description ==
It is a shrub or small tree reaching 5 meters in height. The branches are hairless and dark-colored. Its elliptical to narrowly oblong, sickle-shaped, papery leaves are 7.5-14 by 2-6 centimeters. The leaves have rounded to wedge-shaped bases and tapering tips. The leaves are hairless, or become hairless at maturity, and dark green. The leaves have 10-12 pairs of secondary veins emanating from their midribs. The secondary veins arch and connect near the margins of the leaves. Its petioles are 2-3 millimeters long, and hairless, with a groove on their upper side. Its solitary Inflorescences occur on branches and the trunk. Each inflorescence has 1 flower. Each flower is on a pedicel. The pedicels have a pair of basal bracts that are covered in silky-brown hair. Its flowers are unisexual. The male flowers are on 4-5 millimeter long pedicels that are positioned at leaf axils on branches. Male flowers have two rounded sepals that are 2 millimeters wide with silky hairs. Male flowers have 4 petals in a single whorl. The petals are narrowly elliptical, 6 by 3 millimeters and covered in brownish silky hairs. Male flowers have numerous, small, rectangular stamens that are 0.5 millimeters long and consist of an anther without a stalk (filament). The female flowers are on 6-10 millimeter long pedicels that are positioned on the trunk and at leaf axils on branches. Female flowers have two rounded to slightly pointed sepals that are 2 millimeters wide with sparse, brown, soft hairs on their outer surface. Female flowers have 4 petals in a single whorl. The petals are opal to pointed, and 5 by 7 millimeters. The petals are covered in pale grey hairs on their outer surface and are hairless on their inner surface. Female flowers have numerous carpels that are 3-3.5 millimeters long. The carpels have short, 0.5 by 0.6 millimeter, black stigmas that have dense, silky hairs. The fruit occur in clusters of 4–6 on pedicles that are 10-15 millimeters long. The fruit are cylindrical, constricted between the seeds, and 3.8-4.5 by 1.2-1.5 centimeters. Each fruit has 4-6 seeds in two rows. The seeds are 10–13 by 6-7 millimeters.

=== Reproductive biology ===
The pollen of U. congensis is shed as permanent tetrads.

=== Distribution and habitat ===
It has been observed growing gallery forests.

== Uses ==
Bioactive compounds extracted from its bark, including acetogenins, have been reported to be cytotoxic in tests with cultured human tumor cells.
