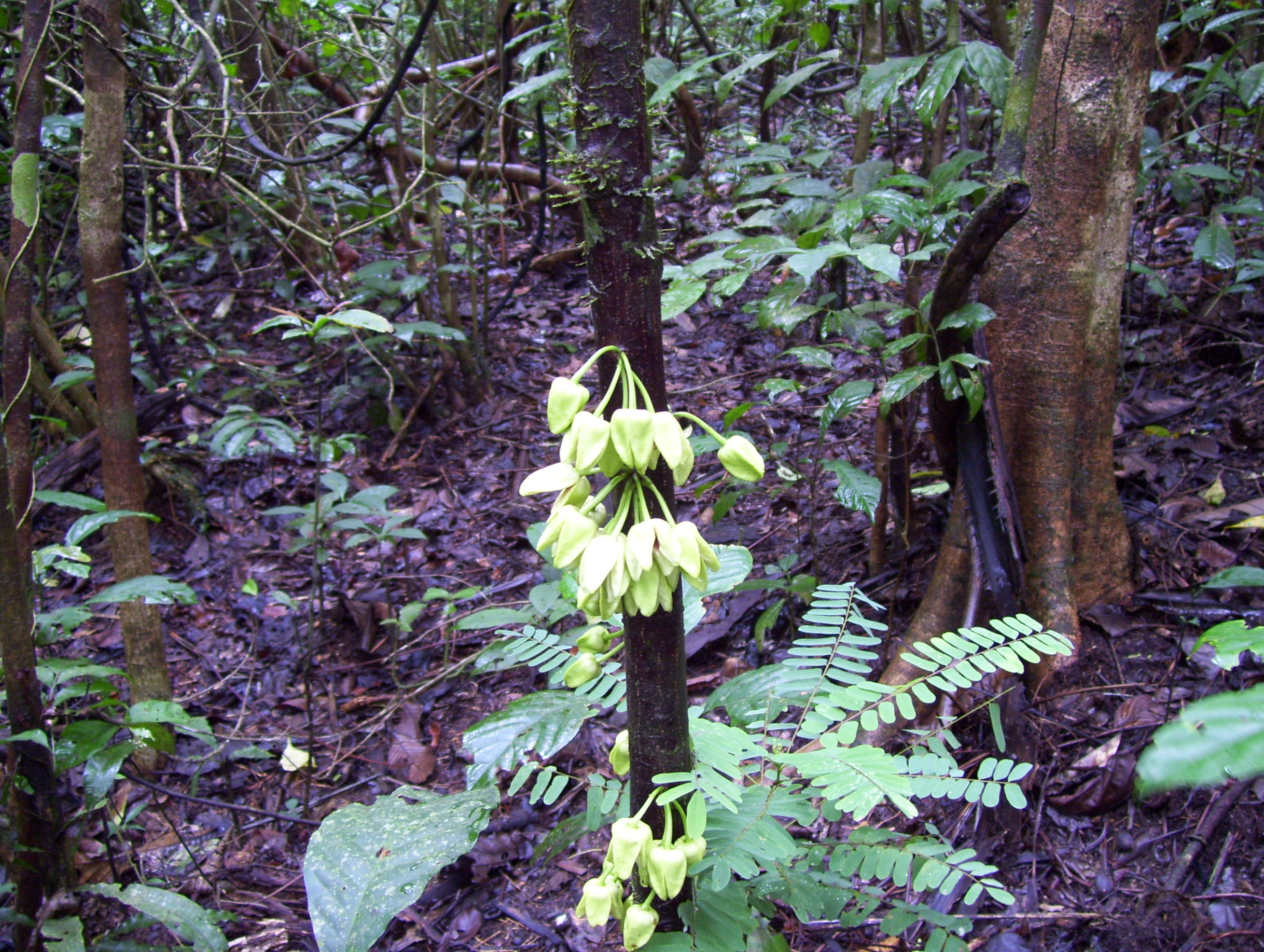
- Uvariopsis dicaprio

Scientific classification
- Kingdom: Plantae
- Clade: Embryophytes
- Clade: Tracheophytes
- Clade: Spermatophytes
- Clade: Angiosperms
- Clade: Magnoliids
- Order: Magnoliales
- Family: Annonaceae
- Subfamily: Annonoideae
- Tribe: Monodoreae
- Genus: Uvariopsis; Engl.

Synonyms
- Tetrastemma Diels; Thonnera De Wild.

= Uvariopsis =

Genus of flowering plants

Uvariopsis is a genus of flowering plants in the family Annonaceae. The genus is unique to Africa, and consists of about 18 species, all of which are either ramiflorous, cauliflorous or both.

The genus was first described in 1899 by Engler. The type species for the genus is Uvariopsis zenkeri Engl.

== Species ==
19 species are accepted.

- Uvariopsis bakeriana (Hutch. & Dalziel) Robyns & Ghesq.
- Uvariopsis bisexualis Verdc.
- Uvariopsis citrata Couvreur & Niangadouma
- Uvariopsis congensis Robyns & Ghesq.
- Uvariopsis congolana (De Wild.) R.E. Fr.
- Uvariopsis dicaprio Cheek & Gosline
- Uvariopsis dioica (Diels) Robyns & Ghesq.
- Uvariopsis etugeana Dagallier & Couvreur
- Uvariopsis guineensis Keay
- Uvariopsis korupensis Gereau & Kenfack
- Uvariopsis lovettiana Couvreur & Q.Luke
- Uvariopsis niangadoumae Couvreur & Dagallier
- Uvariopsis noldeae Exell & Mendonça
- Uvariopsis oligocarpa Dagallier & Couvreur
- Uvariopsis pedunculosa (Diels) Robyns & Ghesq.
- Uvariopsis sessiliflora (Mildbr. & Diels) Robyns & Ghesq.
- Uvariopsis solheidii (De Wild.) Robyns & Ghesq.
- Uvariopsis submontana Kenfack, Gosline & Gereau
- Uvariopsis zenkeri Engl.
