= Plerandra actinostigma =

Scientific classification
- Kingdom: Plantae
- Clade: Tracheophytes
- Clade: Angiosperms
- Clade: Eudicots
- Clade: Asterids
- Order: Apiales
- Family: Araliaceae
- Genus: Plerandra
- Species: P. actinostigma

Binomial name
- Plerandra actinostigma (A.C.Sm. & B.C.Stone) G.M.Plunkett, Lowry & Frodin

Species of plant

Plerandra actinostigma is a flowering plant in the family Araliaceae. It was first described in 1968, as Schefflera actinostigma, and is endemic to Vanuatu.
