= Isolona dewevrei =

Conservation status
- Least Concern (IUCN 3.1)

Scientific classification
- Kingdom: Plantae
- Clade: Embryophytes
- Clade: Tracheophytes
- Clade: Spermatophytes
- Clade: Angiosperms
- Clade: Magnoliids
- Order: Magnoliales
- Family: Annonaceae
- Genus: Isolona
- Species: I. dewevrei

Binomial name
- Isolona dewevrei (De Wild. & T.Durand) Engl. & Diels

Synonyms
- Monodora dewevrei De Wild. & T.Durand

Species of flowering plant

Isolona dewevrei is a species of plant in the Annonaceae family. It is endemic to the Democratic Republic of the Congo. It is threatened by habitat loss.
