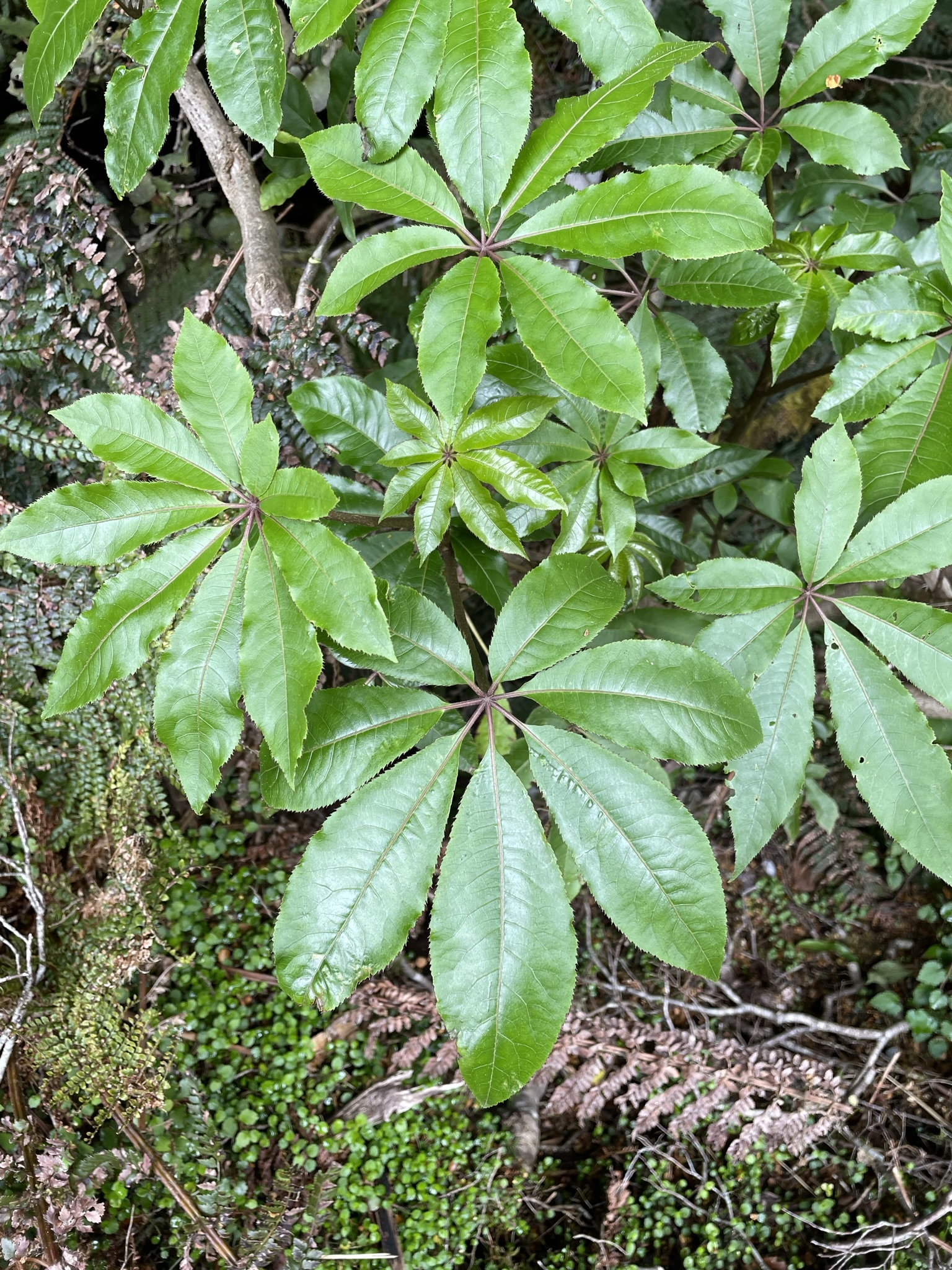
- Foliage of Schefflera digitata

Conservation status
- Not Threatened (NZ TCS)

Scientific classification
- Kingdom: Plantae
- Clade: Tracheophytes
- Clade: Angiosperms
- Clade: Eudicots
- Clade: Asterids
- Order: Apiales
- Family: Araliaceae
- Genus: Schefflera
- Species: S. digitata

Binomial name
- Schefflera digitata J.R.Forst. & G.Forst.

= Schefflera digitata =

Species of flowering plant

Schefflera digitata, commonly known as patē, seven finger (or seven-finger), is a species of tree in the family Araliaceae. It is endemic to New Zealand and is widespread in the North, South, and Stewart Islands. It occurs in lowland to montane forests from sea level to 1,200 m (3,900 ft). It prefers damp, shady parts of the forest and is common along stream banks. It is the only New Zealand member of the genus Schefflera, which has 12 other species in Oceania.

Schefflera digitata usually grows to heights of 4–6 metres (13–20 feet). The species is often confused with five-finger (Pseudopanax arboreus). S. digitata was first described in 1776 by the German naturalists Georg and Johann Reinhold Forster. S. digitata is pollinated by insects. The fruits are dispersed by fruit-eating animals (frugivores), such as birds. S. digitata's timber was utilised by indigenous Māori to obtain fire by friction. The juice of the fruits was used as a dye by Māori, and European settlers used it as a substitute for ink. S. digitata's 2023 conservation status in the New Zealand Threat Classification System was "Not Threatened".

== Description ==
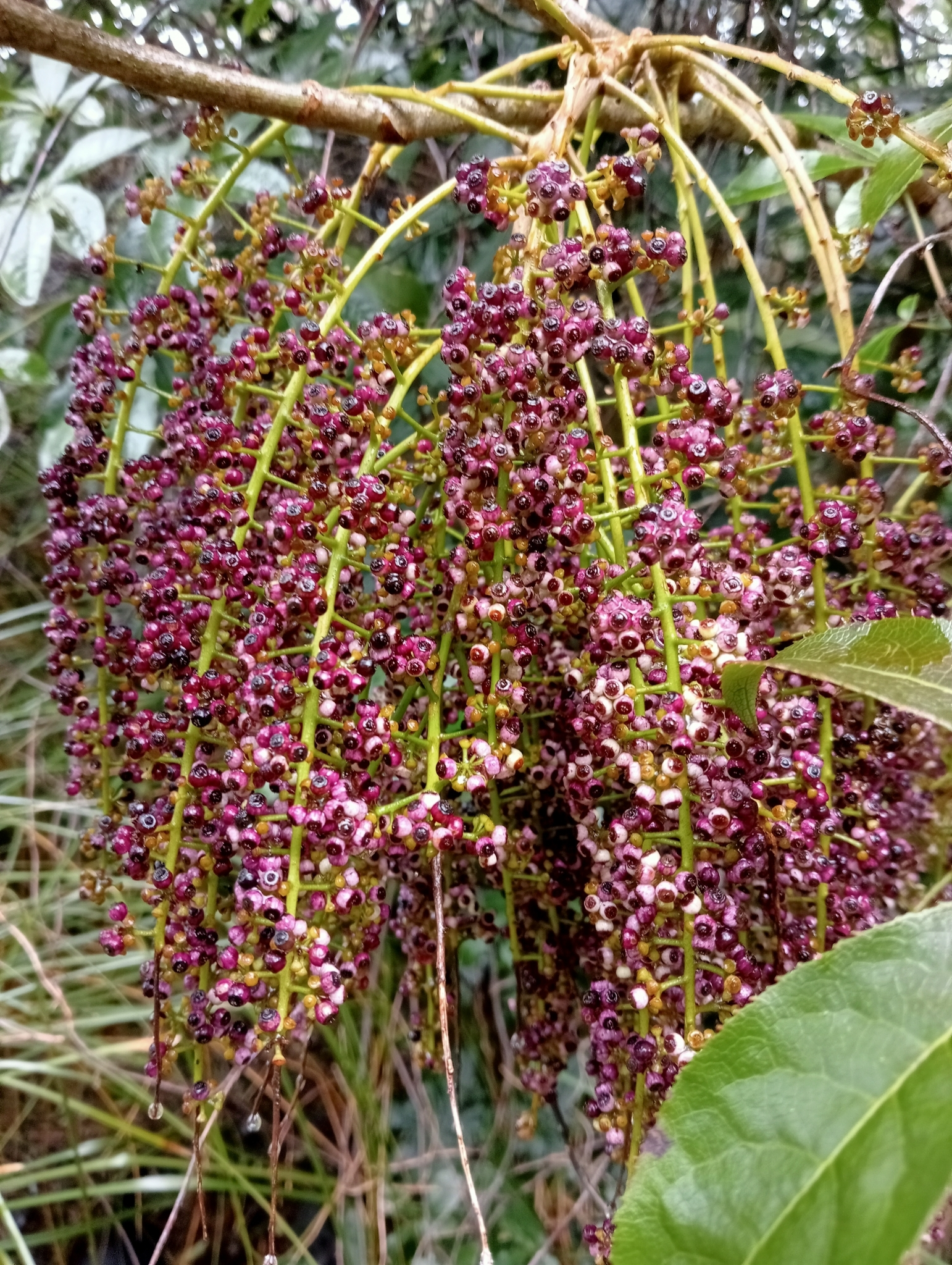
Small hanging fruits of S. digitata

Schefflera digitata (patē) is an evergreen and dioecious species of tree in the family Araliaceae. It reaches a height of up to 8–9 metres (26–30 feet) tall, although more commonly 4–6 m (13–20 ft) tall. The trunk is branched and the bark is greenish in colour and ridged with scattered bumps. Its reddish, round petioles are up to 25 cm (9.8 in) long. Its petiolules are also reddish and are up to 2 cm (0.79 in) long.

Leaves are palmately compound, usually with seven leaflets (called 'fingers'); mature leaves are green above and paler below, while young leaves are shiny and purplish underneath. The terminal leaflets are the largest, up to 20 cm (7.9 in) long, with smaller side leaflets. The leaflets are broader toward the tip, pointed to blunt at the ends. The leaf margins are sharply toothed in adults and irregularly lobed in young plants. The leaves are similar, and are often confused with five-finger (Pseudopanax arboreus); although the leaflets of P. aboreus are smaller, thicker and have larger teeth.

The inflorescences (flower clusters) are found on hanging panicles, with numerous spreading branches which are up to 35 cm (14 in) long. The bracts and bracteoles are small. Each umbel contains up to ten flowers. The peduncles are 10 mm (0.39 in) long, but the pedicels are shorter. Flowers are small, at about 7 mm (0.28 in) in diameter and greenish-cream in colour. The petals are usually 5 mm (0.20 in) in diameter. Each flower has five filamentous stamens. Fruits are dark purple or violet when ripened, somewhat globe-shaped, and about 3.5 mm (0.14 in) in diameter. The seeds are 2–2.5 mm (0.079–0.098 in) long.

== Taxonomy ==
Schefflera digitata was first described in 1776 by the German naturalists Georg and Johann Reinhold Forster in their book Characteres generum plantarum, which was made during the second voyage of James Cook. S. digitata is the type species of the genus Schefflera. It is the only New Zealand member of the genus Schefflera. There are thirteen species of this genus currently accepted by the Plants of the World Online taxonomic database. These species are native to islands in the Pacific: New Zealand, Fiji, New Caledonia, Samoa and Vanuatu.

=== Etymology ===
The etymology (word origin) of S. digitata's genus name, Schefflera, is named in honour of the physician Johann Peter Ernst von Scheffler. The specific epithet (second part of the scientific name), digitata, means 'divided into fingers' or 'finger-like parts'. It is derived from the Latin digitus meaning 'finger'. The species is commonly known as 'patē' and 'seven-finger'.

== Ecology ==
Schefflera digitata's seeds are dispersed by fruit-eating animals such as birds. Several birds have been recorded as seed dispersers, including bellbirds (Anthornis melanura), kererū (Hemiphaga novaeseelandiae), kōkako (Callaeas), tūī (Prosthemadera novaeseelandiae), stitchbirds (Notiomystis cincta), and silvereyes (Zosterops lateralis). Pollination is achieved by insects. The caterpillars of the patē owlet (Meterana merope) feed on the tree. S. digitata also plays host to the New Zealand vegetable bug (Glaucias amyoti) and lemon tree borer (Oemona hirta). S. digitata is also a primary host of the root parasite, Dactylanthus taylorii.

== Distribution ==
Schefflera digitata is endemic to New Zealand. It is widespread in the North, South, and Stewart Islands. The conservation status of S. digitata in the New Zealand Threat Classification System was evaluated in 2023 as "Not Threatened".

=== Habitat ===
Schefflera digitata is typically found in lowland to montane forests, growing from sea level up to 1,200 m (3,900 ft) above sea level at maximum elevation. It is a shade-tolerant species, and it prefers well-drained and fertile soils, commonly establishing itself along streams in shaded areas. S. digitata can also establish itself as an epiphyte (growing on another plant) and in wet rocky areas.

== Uses ==
Schefflera digitata's timber was used by indigenous Māori to obtain fire by friction. There are no recorded uses of the timber by European settlers. The juice of the fruits was used as a dye by Māori, and Europeans used it as a substitute for ink. S. digitata's Māori names include patē, patatē, kōtētē, and kohi.

Schefflera digitata had medicinal significance to Māori as well. S. digitata's leaves contain compounds of falcarindiol, which may be beneficial in treating skin fungus. The sap of the tree was used to cure various skin diseases. The leaves were also used to wrap newborn Māori babies to keep them warm until they began to perspire.

== Works cited ==
Books

- Crowe, Andrew (2009). Which Native Tree? New Zealand Native Trees: A Simple Guide to their Identification, Ecology and Uses. Auckland, New Zealand: Penguin Books. ISBN 978-0-14-300899-6.
- Dawson, John; Lucas, Rob (2011). Field Guide to New Zealand's Native Trees. Nelson, New Zealand: Potton & Burton. ISBN 978-1-877517-01-3.
- Eagle, Audrey (2006). Eagle's Complete Trees and Shrubs of New Zealand. Vol. 1. Wellington, New Zealand: Te Papa Press. ISBN 0-909010-08-0.
- Forster, Georg; Forster, Johann Reinhold (1776). Characteres generum plantarum [...]' (in Latin). Prostant apud B. White, T. Cadell, & P. Elmsly.
- Gledhill, David (6 March 2008). The Names of Plants. Cambridge, United Kingdom: Cambridge University Press. ISBN 978-0-521-68553-5.
- Laing, R. M. (1906). Plants of New Zealand. Christchurch, New Zealand: Whitcombe and Tombs – via the Internet Archive.
- Salmon, John Tenison (1986). The Native Trees of New Zealand. Auckland: Penguin Books. ISBN 978-0-7900-0104-3 – via the Internet Archive.
- Wardle, J. (2011). Wardle's Native Plants of New Zealand and Their Story. Bateson Publishing Limited. ISBN 978-1-877-52006-8.

Journals

- Burrows, C. J. (1995). "Germination behaviour of the seeds of the New Zealand species Aristotelia serrata, Coprosma robusta, Cordyline australis, Myrtus obcordata, and Schefflera digitata". New Zealand Journal of Botany. 33 (2): 257–264. doi:10.1080/0028825X.1995.10410488. ISSN 0028-825X.
- Lee, W.G.; Hodgkinson, I.J.; Johnson, P.N. (1990). "A Test For Ultraviolet Reflectance from Fleshy Fruits of New Zealand Plant Species". New Zealand Journal of Botany. 28 (1): 21–24. doi:10.1080/0028825X.1990.10412340. ISSN 0028-825X.
- Plunkett, Gregory M.; Lowry, Porter P.; Frodin, David G.; Wen, Jun (2005). "Phylogeny and Geography of Schefflera: Pervasive Polyphyly in the Largest Genus of Araliaceae". Annals of the Missouri Botanical Garden. 92 (2). Missouri Botanical Garden Press: 202–224. ISSN 0026-6493. JSTOR 3298514.
- Sopow, Stephanie L.; Bain, John (2017). "A checklist of New Zealand Cerambycidae (Insecta: Coleoptera), excluding Lamiinae". New Zealand Entomologist. 40 (2): 55–71. Bibcode:2017NZEnt..40...55S. doi:10.1080/00779962.2017.1357423. ISSN 0077-9962.

Websites

- De Lange, Peter (2026). "Schefflera digitata". New Zealand Plant Conservation Network. Archived from the original on 20 May 2025.
- "Ngā Rauropi Whakaoranga — Schefflera digitata. Patē. Seven-finger". Manaaki Whenua – Landcare Research. 2023. Archived from the original on 4 February 2025.
- "Schefflera digitata J.R.Forst. & G.Forst., Char. Gen. Pl., ed. 2. 46, t. 23 (1776)". The Royal Botanic Gardens, Kew, Harvard University Herbaria & Libraries and Australian National Herbarium. International Plant Names Index. 2026. Archived from the original on 6 October 2025.
- "Schefflera J.R.Forst. & G.Forst". Plants of the World Online. Archived from the original on 1 August 2025 – via Royal Botanic Gardens, Kew.
