= Ebo Wildlife Reserve =

Protected area in Cameroon

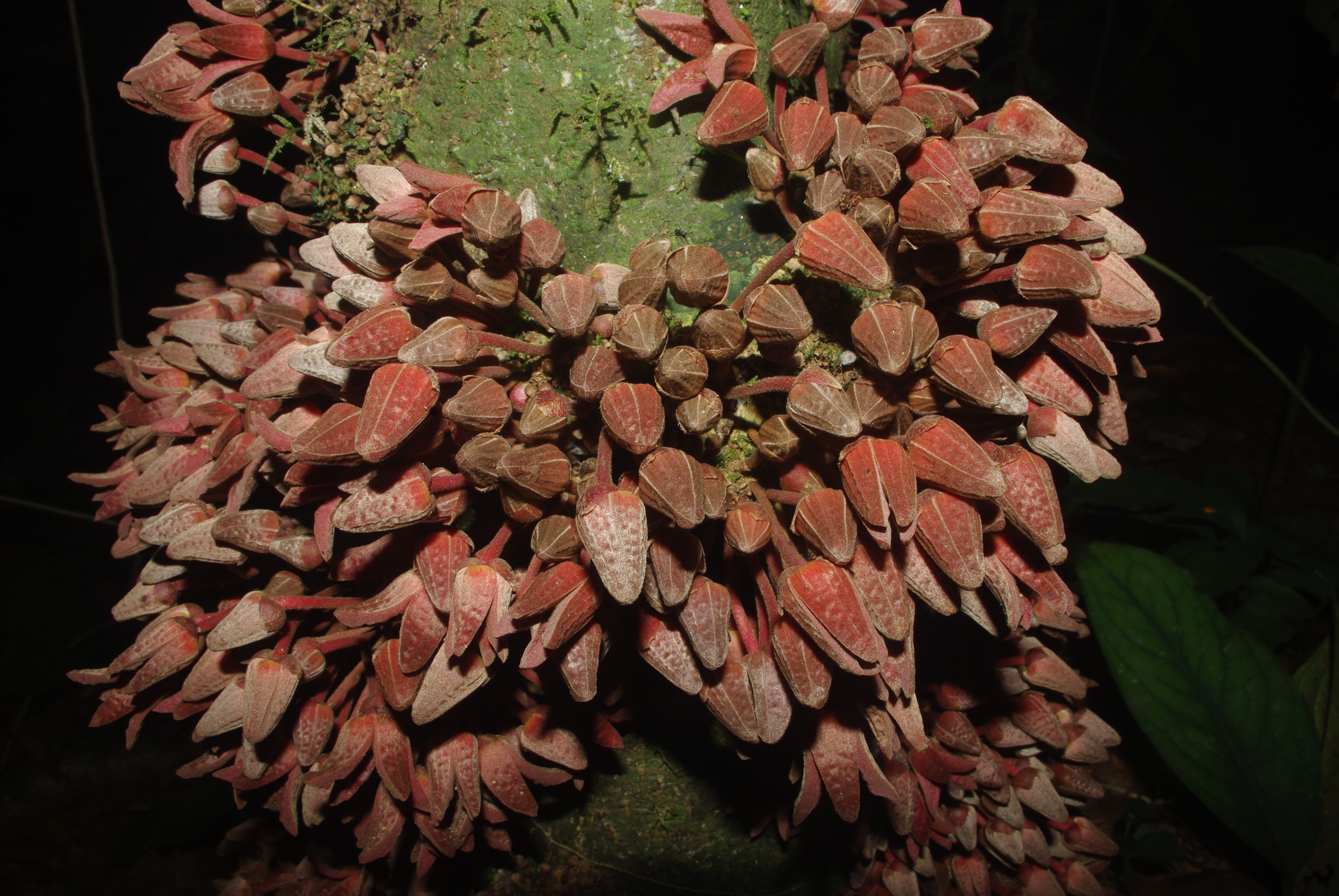
- Uvariopsis submontana growth in Ebo Wildlife Reserve

- Location within Cameroon
- Location: Littoral Region, Cameroon
- Coordinates: 4.319°N 10.33°E
- Area: 1,417 km^{2} (547 mi^{2})

The Ebo Wildlife Reserve is a protected area and proposed national park in Cameroon that covers 1,417 km^{2} (547 mi^{2}) of lowland and montane forest mosaic with a high proportion of disturbed forest.

== Geography and history ==
Ebo Forest is 20 kilometres (12 mi) north of the Sanaga River. The Ebo Forest Research Station was established in April 2005, and preliminary biological inventories suggest the Ebo Forest has comparable biodiversity to other centres of endemism in the Cameroon-Nigeria highlands region.

Forty nearby communities—including those of the Banen people—rely on the forest's wildlife for food, water, medicine and culture.

== Wildlife ==
Being half of the Yabassi Key Biodiversity Area, Ebo Forest is the most intact ecosystem in the Gulf of Guinea.

The critically endangered Preuss's red colobus has been recorded within the area. Other animals found there include Nigeria-Cameroon chimpanzees, Western gorillas, Goliath frogs, African forest elephants, Drills, grey-necked rockfowls and grey parrots.

During a research trip, biologist Ekwoge Abwe discovered Nigeria-Cameroon chimpanzees cracking nuts and using sticks to collect termites, the only known instance of chimpanzees doing so. Another biologist, Bethan Morgan, observed a possibly undescribed gorilla subspecies in the area. In 2011, the Cameroonian government created the Nigeria-Cameroon Chimpanzee Action Plan.

== Logging ==
On 4 February 2020, minister of forestry Jules Doret Ndongo and prime minister Joseph Ngute enacted two proposals to reclassify Ebo Forest for logging, both of which cover most of the forest. A group of scientists sent a letter to Ngute for the reversion of the proposals, and the decision was reverted. In July, it was redesignated for logging, a decision which was again reverted in August. In 2022, a road began construction through the southern portion of the forest, but was later suspended. On 27 April 2023, the area was reclassified for logging.
