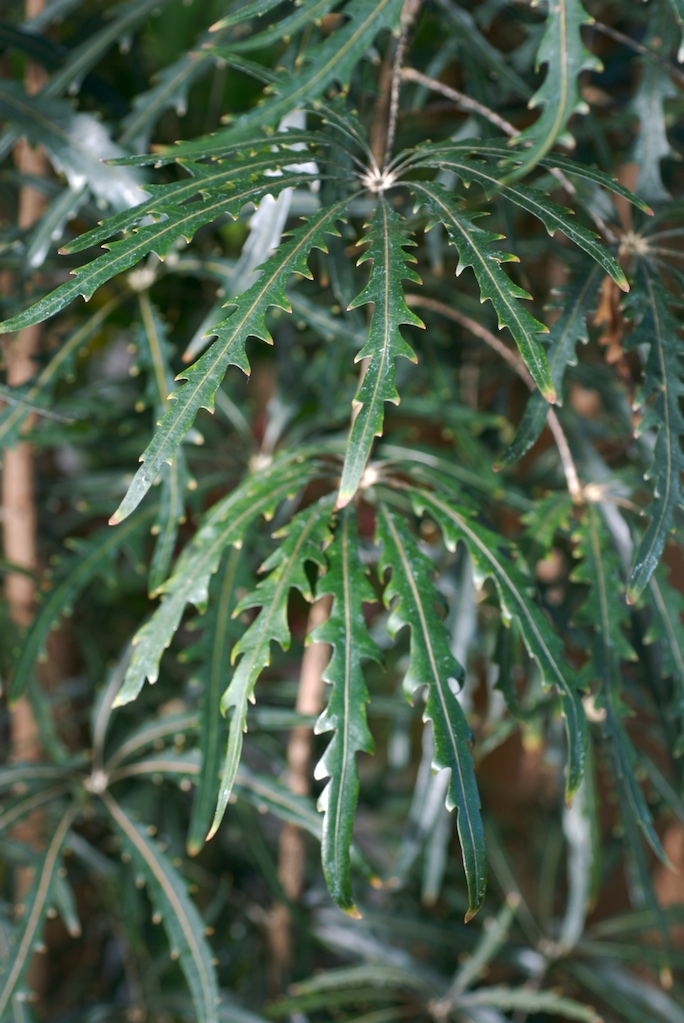

Conservation status
- Endangered (IUCN 3.1)

Scientific classification
- Kingdom: Plantae
- Clade: Tracheophytes
- Clade: Angiosperms
- Clade: Eudicots
- Clade: Asterids
- Order: Apiales
- Family: Araliaceae
- Genus: Plerandra
- Species: P. elegantissima

Binomial name
- Plerandra elegantissima (H.J.Veitch ex Mast.) Lowry, G.M.Plunkett & Frodin

Synonyms
- Homotypic Synonyms: Aralia elegantissima H.J.Veitch ex Mast.; Dizygotheca elegantissima (H.J.Veitch ex Mast.) R.Vig. & Guillaumin; Schefflera elegantissima (H.J.Veitch ex Mast.) Lowry & Frodin; Heterotypic Synonyms: Dizygotheca faguetii (Baill.) R.Vig.; Schefflera faguetii Baill.

= Plerandra elegantissima =

Species of tree

Plerandra elegantissima, the false aralia, is a species of flowering plant in the family Araliaceae. It is native to New Caledonia.

== Description ==
Growing to 8–15 m (26–49 ft) tall by 2 m (7 ft) broad, it is an evergreen shrub or tree. Its leaves are thin, coppery red to dark green with toothed edges and consist of 7-11 leaflets. On adult plants the leaves are much broader. In autumn it bears clusters of pale green flowers followed by black fruit.

== Cultivation ==
With a minimum temperature of 13–15 °C (55–59 °F), in temperate zones it is grown as a houseplant and is much more compact, typically reaching heights of 2–3 m (7–10 ft). In cultivation, it needs a lot of light and humidity. The soil should dry out between watering. This plant has little branching and is sensitive to the appearance of mealybugs.

Under the name Schefflera elegantissima, this plant has gained the Royal Horticultural Society's Award of Garden Merit.
