= Uvariopsis congolana =

- Botanical illustration of Uvariopsis congolana using the basionym Thonnera congolana

Conservation status
- Least Concern (IUCN 3.1)

Scientific classification
- Kingdom: Plantae
- Clade: Embryophytes
- Clade: Tracheophytes
- Clade: Spermatophytes
- Clade: Angiosperms
- Clade: Magnoliids
- Order: Magnoliales
- Family: Annonaceae
- Genus: Uvariopsis
- Species: U. congolana

Binomial name
- Uvariopsis congolana (De Wild.) R.E.Fr.

Synonyms
- Thonnera congolana De Wild.

Species of flowering plant

Uvariopsis congolana is a species of plant in the Annonaceae family. It is native to Cameroon, the Democratic Republic of the Congo, Gabon, and the Republic of the Congo. Émile De Wildeman, the botanist who first formally described the species using the basionym Thonnera congolana, named it after the Belgian Congo now called the Democratic Republic of the Congo, where the specimens he examined were collected near Makanza (then called Bangala) and Yambuya.

== Description ==
It is tree reaching 10 meters in height. Its slender, egg-shaped to oblong, leathery leaves are 27-30 by 6.5-9.5 centimeters. The leaves have rounded to wedge-shaped bases and tapering tips with the tapering portion up to 3 centimeters long. The leaves are hairless. The leaves have around 12 pairs of secondary veins emanating from their midribs. The secondary veins arch and connect near the margins of the leaves. Its short petioles are 4-5 millimeters long. Its flowers occur clusters on the lower trunk. Each flower is on an slender, elongated pedicel up to 38 centimeters long. The pedicels have clasping bracts that are 2 millimeters long and covered in rust-colored hair. Its flowers are unisexual. Its flowers have two sepals that are 4 millimeters long and bent back. Male flowers have 3 triangular petals in a single whorl. The petals are 2.2 by 1.7 centimeters. The petals are shallowly pointed and thickened toward their tips. Male flowers have stamens that consist of an anther without a stalk (filament). The anthers have two locules. Female flowers have 3 triangular petals in a single whorl. The petals are 2.2 by 1.7 centimeters. The petals are shallowly pointed and thickened toward their tips. Female flowers have hairy, irregularly cylindrical carpels that are truncated at the top. The carpels have indistinct stigmas. The fruit are oblong to elliptical, with wedge shaped bases and tips and are 5-8 by 2.5-3.2 centimeters. The surface of the fruit has prominent vein-like patterning.

=== Reproductive biology ===
The pollen of U. congolana is shed as permanent tetrads.

=== Distribution and habitat ===
It has been observed growing in rain forests.

== Uses ==
Bioactive compounds extracted from its tissues, have been reported to have antiplasmodial activity in laboratory tests using cultured Plasmodium falciparum.
