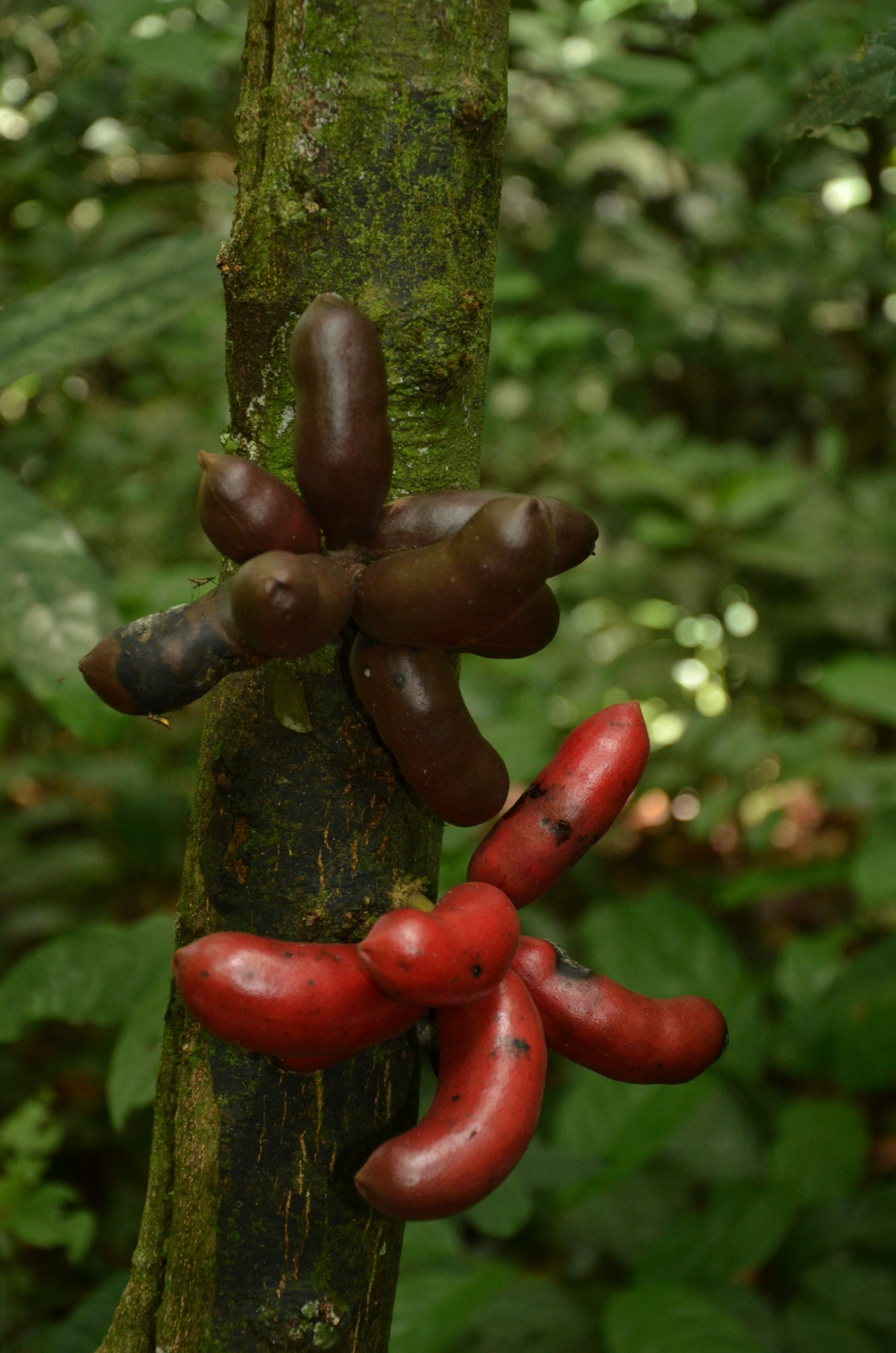
- Ripe fruit

Conservation status
- Least Concern (IUCN 3.1)

Scientific classification
- Kingdom: Plantae
- Clade: Embryophytes
- Clade: Tracheophytes
- Clade: Spermatophytes
- Clade: Angiosperms
- Clade: Magnoliids
- Order: Magnoliales
- Family: Annonaceae
- Genus: Uvariopsis
- Species: U. guineensis

Binomial name
- Uvariopsis guineensis Keay

= Uvariopsis guineensis =

Species of flowering plant

Uvariopsis guineensis is a species of plant in the custard apple family Annonaceae. It is native to Guinea, Ivory Coast, Liberia, and Sierra Leone. Ronald William John Keay, the botanist who first formally described the species, named it after Guinea, then called French Guinea, where the specimens he examined were collected near a locality he identifies as Fassakoidou.

== Description ==
It is tree reaching 10.7 meters in height. Its flowers occur clusters on the lower trunk. The very fragrant flowers are on hairless pedicel that are 20 by 4 millimeters. Its flowers have bi-lobed sepals that are 11-12 millimeters in diameter. Its flowers have 4 fleshy, oval to triangular petals that are 5-6 millimeters thick and 18-20 by 14-17 millimeters. The petals are united at their base for 5-7 millimeters. The petals are hairless inside, green on their outer surface and yellow inside. Male flowers have a mass of densely packed, brownish stamens that are collectively 5 millimeters in diameter. The fruit are positioned low on the trunk, near ground level. The fruit are on pedicels that are 6.5 centimeters long. The red fruit are irregular in shape and up to 4.5 centimeters long.

=== Reproductive biology ===
The pollen of Uvariopsis guineensis is shed as permanent tetrads.

=== Distribution and habitat ===
It has been observed growing in subtropical and tropical, moist lowland forests under dense canopy.

== Uses ==
Based on interviews with traditional healers in Guinea it has been recorded as being used to treat skin ailments.
