= Neocussonia =

Scientific classification
- Kingdom: Plantae
- Clade: Tracheophytes
- Clade: Angiosperms
- Clade: Eudicots
- Clade: Asterids
- Order: Apiales
- Family: Araliaceae
- Genus: Neocussonia; Hutch.

Genus of plants

Neocussonia is a genus of flowering plants belonging to the family Araliaceae.

Its native range is Tanzania to s. Africa and Madagascar. It is also found in the Cape Provinces, KwaZulu-Natal, the Northern Provinces (regions of South Africa), Malawi, Mozambique, Eswatini and Zimbabwe.

The genus name of Neocussonia is in honour of Pierre Cusson (1727–1783), a French botanist who specialised in Umbelliferae, and it was first described and published in Gen. Fl. Pl. Vol.2 on page 79 in 1967.

== Known species ==
According to Kew:

- Neocussonia bojeri (Seem.) Hutch.
- Neocussonia bracteolifera (Frodin) Lowry, G.M.Plunkett, Gostel & Frodin
- Neocussonia capuroniana (Bernardi) Lowry, G.M.Plunkett, Gostel & Frodin
- Neocussonia favargeri (Bernardi) Lowry, G.M.Plunkett, Gostel & Frodin
- Neocussonia fosbergiana (Bernardi) Lowry, G.M.Plunkett, Gostel & Frodin
- Neocussonia frodiniana (Bernardi) Lowry, G.M.Plunkett, Gostel & Frodin
- Neocussonia halleana (Bernardi) Lowry, G.M.Plunkett, Gostel & Frodin
- Neocussonia litoralis (Bernardi) Lowry, G.M.Plunkett, Gostel & Frodin
- Neocussonia longipedicellata (Lecomte) Lowry, G.M.Plunkett, Gostel & Frodin
- Neocussonia lukwangulensis (Tennant) Lowry, G.M.Plunkett, Gostel & Frodin
- Neocussonia moratii (Bernardi) Lowry, G.M.Plunkett, Gostel & Frodin
- Neocussonia rainaliana (Bernardi) Lowry, G.M.Plunkett, Gostel & Frodin
- Neocussonia staufferiana (Bernardi) Lowry, G.M.Plunkett, Gostel & Frodin
- Neocussonia umbellifera (Sond.) Hutch.
- Neocussonia vantsilana (Baker) Lowry, G.M.Plunkett, Gostel & Frodin
- Neocussonia weibeliana (Bernardi) Lowry, G.M.Plunkett, Gostel & Frodin

== See also ==
- Schefflera
