= Zenker's worm snake =

Conservation status
- Data Deficient (IUCN 3.1)

Scientific classification
- Kingdom: Animalia
- Phylum: Chordata
- Class: Reptilia
- Order: Squamata
- Suborder: Serpentes
- Family: Typhlopidae
- Genus: Letheobia
- Species: L. zenkeri

Binomial name
- Letheobia zenkeri Sternfeld, 1908

Synonyms
- Typhlops zenkeri Sternfeld, 1908; Typhlops vermis Boulenger, 1914; Typhlops zenkeri — McDiarmid, Campbell & Touré, 1999; Rhinotyphlops zenkeri — Chirio & Lebreton, 2007; Letheobia zenkeri — Hedges et al. 2014

Species of snake

Zenker's worm snake (Letheobia zenkeri) is a species of snake in the family Typhlopidae. The species is native to Central Africa.

== Etymology ==
The specific name, zenkeri, is in honor of German botanist Georg August Zenker.

== Geographic range ==
L. zenkeri is endemic to Cameroon.

== Description ==
L. zenkeri may attain a total length (including tail) of 12–13.5 centimetres (4.7–5.3 in). It has 18 scales around the body, and is "colourless" (farblos, in German).

== Reproduction ==
L. zenkeri is oviparous.
