= Crepinella weberbaueri =

Conservation status
- Least Concern (IUCN 3.1)

Scientific classification
- Kingdom: Plantae
- Clade: Embryophytes
- Clade: Tracheophytes
- Clade: Spermatophytes
- Clade: Angiosperms
- Clade: Eudicots
- Clade: Asterids
- Order: Apiales
- Family: Araliaceae
- Genus: Crepinella
- Species: C. weberbaueri

Binomial name
- Crepinella weberbaueri (Harms) D.A.Neill, Lowry & G.M.Plunkett

Synonyms
- Didymopanax weberbaueri Harms (1908); Schefflera harmsii J.F.Macbr. (1959)

Species of plant

Crepinella weberbaueri is a species of flowering plant in the family Araliaceae. It a shrub or small tree native to southeastern Ecuador and Peru. It grows in lower montane Amazonian rain forest on sandy and poor soils.
