= Schefflera euthytricha =

Conservation status
- Endangered (IUCN 3.1)

Scientific classification
- Kingdom: Plantae
- Clade: Tracheophytes
- Clade: Angiosperms
- Clade: Eudicots
- Clade: Asterids
- Order: Apiales
- Family: Araliaceae
- Genus: Schefflera
- Species: S. euthytricha

Binomial name
- Schefflera euthytricha A.C. Smith

Species of flowering plant

Schefflera euthytricha is a species of plant in the family Araliaceae. It is endemic to Fiji.
