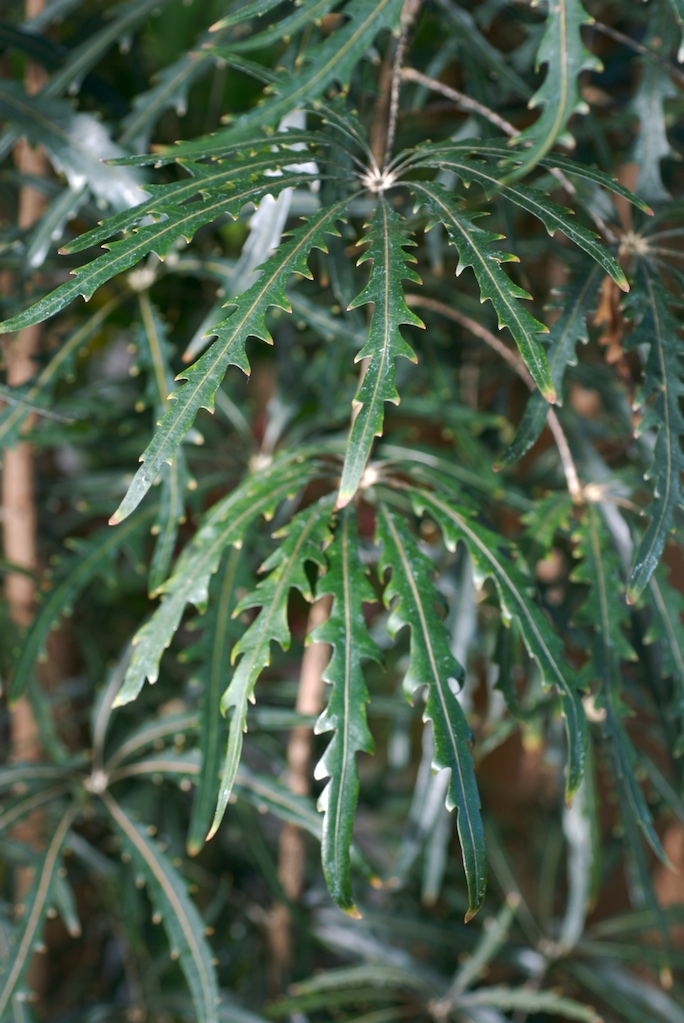
- Plerandra elegantissima is commonly grown as an ornamental plant for its juvenile leaf form

Scientific classification
- Kingdom: Plantae
- Clade: Tracheophytes
- Clade: Angiosperms
- Clade: Eudicots
- Clade: Asterids
- Order: Apiales
- Family: Araliaceae
- Subfamily: Aralioideae
- Genus: Plerandra; A.Gray

Species
- See text

Synonyms
- Bakeria Seem.; Dizygotheca N.E. Br.; Octotheca R. Vig.

= Plerandra =

Genus of plants

Plerandra is a genus of flowering plants in the family Araliaceae that has long been considered a synonym of Schefflera, which has been a polyphyletic group.

== Species ==
Species include:

- Plerandra actinostigma (A.C. Sm. & B.C. Stone) G. M. Plunkett, Lowry & Frodin
- Plerandra baillonii (R. Vig.) Lowry, G. M. Plunkett & Frodin
- Plerandra bakeriana (Seem.) A.C. Sm.
- Plerandra brassii Philipson
- Plerandra cabalionii (Lowry) Lowry, G. M. Plunkett & Frodin
- Plerandra calcicola Lowry & G. M. Plunkett ined.
- Plerandra costata (A.C. Sm.) G. M. Plunkett, Lowry & Frodin
- Plerandra crassipes (Baill.) Lowry, G. M. Plunkett & Frodin
- Plerandra elegantissima (Veitch ex Mast.) Lowry, G. M. Plunkett & Frodin
- Plerandra elongata (Baill.) Lowry, G. M. Plunkett & Frodin
- Plerandra emiliana (Baill.) Lowry, G. M. Plunkett & Frodin
- Plerandra gabriellae (Baill.) Lowry, G. M. Plunkett & Frodin
- Plerandra gordonii Lowry, G. M. Plunkett & Frodin ined.
- Plerandra graeffei Dammann
- Plerandra grandiflora A.C. Sm.
- Plerandra grayi Seem.
- Plerandra hogkugu Harms
- Plerandra insolita A.C. Sm.
- Plerandra jatrophifolia Hance
- Plerandra leptophylla (Veitch ex T. Moore) Lowry, G. M. Plunkett & Frodin
- Plerandra letocartiorum Lowry & G. M. Plunkett ined.
- Plerandra longistyla Lowry, G. M. Plunkett & Frodin
- Plerandra mackeei Lowry & G. M. Plunkett ined.
- Plerandra memaoyaensis Lowry & G. M. Plunkett ined.
- Plerandra micrantha Philipson
- Plerandra moratiana Lowry & G. M. Plunkett ined.
- Plerandra neocaledonica Lowry, G. M. Plunkett & Frodin
- Plerandra nono (Baill.) Lowry, G. M. Plunkett & Frodin
- Plerandra osyana (Veitch ex Regel) Lowry, G. M. Plunkett & Frodin
- Plerandra pachyphylla (Harms) Lowry, G. M. Plunkett & Frodin
- Plerandra pancheri (Baill.) Lowry, G. M. Plunkett & Frodin
- Plerandra paucidens (Miq.) Baill.
- Plerandra paucidentata Baill.
- Plerandra pickeringii A. Gray
- Plerandra plerandroides (R. Vig.) Lowry, G. M. Plunkett & Frodin
- Plerandra polydactylis (Montr.) Lowry, G. M. Plunkett & Frodin
- Plerandra pouemboutensis Lowry & G. M. Plunkett
- Plerandra reginae (hort. ex W. Richards) Lowry, G. M. Plunkett & Frodin
- Plerandra seemanniana (A.C. Sm.) G. M. Plunkett, Lowry & Frodin
- Plerandra solomonensis Philipson
- Plerandra stahliana Warb.
- Plerandra tannae (A.C. Sm. & B.C. Stone) G. M. Plunkett, Lowry & Frodin
- Plerandra taomensis Lowry, G. M. Plunkett & Frodin ined.
- Plerandra toto Lowry & G. M. Plunkett
- Plerandra tronchetii Lowry & G. M. Plunkett ined.
- Plerandra vanuatua (Lowry) Lowry, G. M. Plunkett & Frodin
- Plerandra veilloniorum Lowry, G. M. Plunkett & Frodin
- Plerandra veitchii (hort. ex Carrière) Lowry, G. M. Plunkett & Frodin
- Plerandra victoriae Gibbs
- Plerandra vitiensis (Seem.) Baill.
