= Zenkerella perplexa =

Conservation status
- Critically Endangered (IUCN 3.1)

Scientific classification
- Kingdom: Plantae
- Clade: Tracheophytes
- Clade: Angiosperms
- Clade: Eudicots
- Clade: Rosids
- Order: Fabales
- Family: Fabaceae
- Genus: Zenkerella
- Species: Z. perplexa

Binomial name
- Zenkerella perplexa Temu

Species of legume

Zenkerella perplexa is a species of plant in the family Fabaceae. It is found only in Tanzania, where it is endemic to the Eastern Arc forests.
