= Uvariopsis bisexualis =

Conservation status
- Endangered (IUCN 3.1)

Scientific classification
- Kingdom: Plantae
- Clade: Embryophytes
- Clade: Tracheophytes
- Clade: Spermatophytes
- Clade: Angiosperms
- Clade: Magnoliids
- Order: Magnoliales
- Family: Annonaceae
- Genus: Uvariopsis
- Species: U. bisexualis

Binomial name
- Uvariopsis bisexualis Verdc.

Species of flowering plant

Uvariopsis bisexualis is a species of plant in the Annonaceae family. It is endemic to Tanzania.
