= Isolona deightonii =

Conservation status
- Vulnerable (IUCN 2.3)

Scientific classification
- Kingdom: Plantae
- Clade: Embryophytes
- Clade: Tracheophytes
- Clade: Spermatophytes
- Clade: Angiosperms
- Clade: Magnoliids
- Order: Magnoliales
- Family: Annonaceae
- Genus: Isolona
- Species: I. deightonii

Binomial name
- Isolona deightonii Keay

Species of flowering plant

Isolona deightonii is a species of plant in the Annonaceae family. It is found in Ghana and Sierra Leone. It is threatened by habitat loss.
