= Schefflera vitiensis =

Conservation status
- Least Concern (IUCN 2.3)

Scientific classification
- Kingdom: Plantae
- Clade: Tracheophytes
- Clade: Angiosperms
- Clade: Eudicots
- Clade: Asterids
- Order: Apiales
- Family: Araliaceae
- Genus: Schefflera
- Species: S. vitiensis

Binomial name
- Schefflera vitiensis (A.Gray) Seem.

Species of flowering plant

Schefflera vitiensis is a species of plant in the family Araliaceae. It is endemic to Fiji.
