= Crepinella =

Scientific classification
- Kingdom: Plantae
- Clade: Embryophytes
- Clade: Tracheophytes
- Clade: Angiosperms
- Clade: Eudicots
- Clade: Asterids
- Order: Apiales
- Family: Araliaceae
- Subfamily: Aralioideae
- Genus: Crepinella; Marchal

Species
- See text

Genus of flowering plants

Crepinella is a genus of flowering plants in the family Araliaceae, native to tropical South America. It was resurrected from Schefflera in 2019.

== Species ==
The following species are accepted:

- Crepinella acaropunctata (Frodin) Lowry, G.M.Plunkett & D.A.Neill
- Crepinella auyantepuiensis (Steyerm.) Lowry, G.M.Plunkett & D.A.Neill
- Crepinella baculosa (Frodin) Lowry, G.M.Plunkett & D.A.Neill
- Crepinella brachypoda (Frodin) Lowry, G.M.Plunkett & D.A.Neill
- Crepinella chimantensis (Steyerm. & Maguire) Lowry, G.M.Plunkett & D.A.Neill
- Crepinella clavigera (Frodin) Lowry, G.M.Plunkett & D.A.Neill
- Crepinella clusietorum (Frodin) Lowry, G.M.Plunkett & D.A.Neill
- Crepinella coriacea (Marchal) Lowry, G.M.Plunkett & D.A.Neill
- Crepinella disparifolia (Frodin) Lowry, G.M.Plunkett & D.A.Neill
- Crepinella dissidens (Frodin) Lowry, G.M.Plunkett & D.A.Neill
- Crepinella eximia (Frodin) Lowry, G.M.Plunkett & D.A.Neill
- Crepinella gracilis Marchal
- Crepinella gracillima (Steyerm. & Maguire) Lowry, G.M.Plunkett & D.A.Neill
- Crepinella hitchcockii (Lasser & Maguire) Lowry, G.M.Plunkett & D.A.Neill
- Crepinella huachamacarii (Maguire, Steyerm. & Frodin) Lowry, G.M.Plunkett & D.A.Neill
- Crepinella huberi (Frodin) Lowry, G.M.Plunkett & D.A.Neill
- Crepinella japurensis (Mart. & Zucc. ex Marchal) D.A.Neill, Lowry & G.M.Plunkett
- Crepinella longistyla (Frodin) G.M.Plunkett, Lowry & D.A.Neill
- Crepinella montana (Gleason) G.M.Plunkett, Lowry & D.A.Neill
- Crepinella myrioneura (Frodin) G.M.Plunkett, Lowry & D.A.Neill
- Crepinella neblinae (Maguire, Steyerm. & Frodin) G.M.Plunkett, Lowry & D.A.Neill
- Crepinella nigrescens (Frodin) G.M.Plunkett, Lowry & D.A.Neill
- Crepinella pallens (Maguire, Steyerm. & Frodin) G.M.Plunkett, Lowry & D.A.Neill
- Crepinella pauciradiata (Maguire, Steyerm. & Frodin) G.M.Plunkett, Lowry & D.A.Neill
- Crepinella psilophylla (Harms) G.M.Plunkett, Lowry & D.A.Neill
- Crepinella simplex (Steyerm. & Holst) G.M.Plunkett, Lowry & D.A.Neill
- Crepinella spruceana (Seem.) G.M.Plunkett, Lowry & D.A.Neill
- Crepinella suaveolens (Frodin) G.M.Plunkett, Lowry & D.A.Neill
- Crepinella ulocephala (Frodin) G.M.Plunkett, Lowry & D.A.Neill
- Crepinella umbellata (N.E.Br.) G.M.Plunkett, Lowry & D.A.Neill
- Crepinella umbraculifera (Frodin) G.M.Plunkett, Lowry & D.A.Neill
- Crepinella varisiana (Frodin) G.M.Plunkett, Lowry & D.A.Neill
- Crepinella weberbaueri (Harms) D.A.Neill, Lowry & G.M.Plunkett
