= Isolona heinsenii =

Conservation status
- Vulnerable (IUCN 3.1)

Scientific classification
- Kingdom: Plantae
- Clade: Embryophytes
- Clade: Tracheophytes
- Clade: Spermatophytes
- Clade: Angiosperms
- Clade: Magnoliids
- Order: Magnoliales
- Family: Annonaceae
- Genus: Isolona
- Species: I. heinsenii

Binomial name
- Isolona heinsenii Engl. & Diels

Species of flowering plant

Isolona heinsenii is a species of flowering plant in the Annonaceae family. It is a tree endemic to eastern Tanzania.
