= Pierre Cusson =

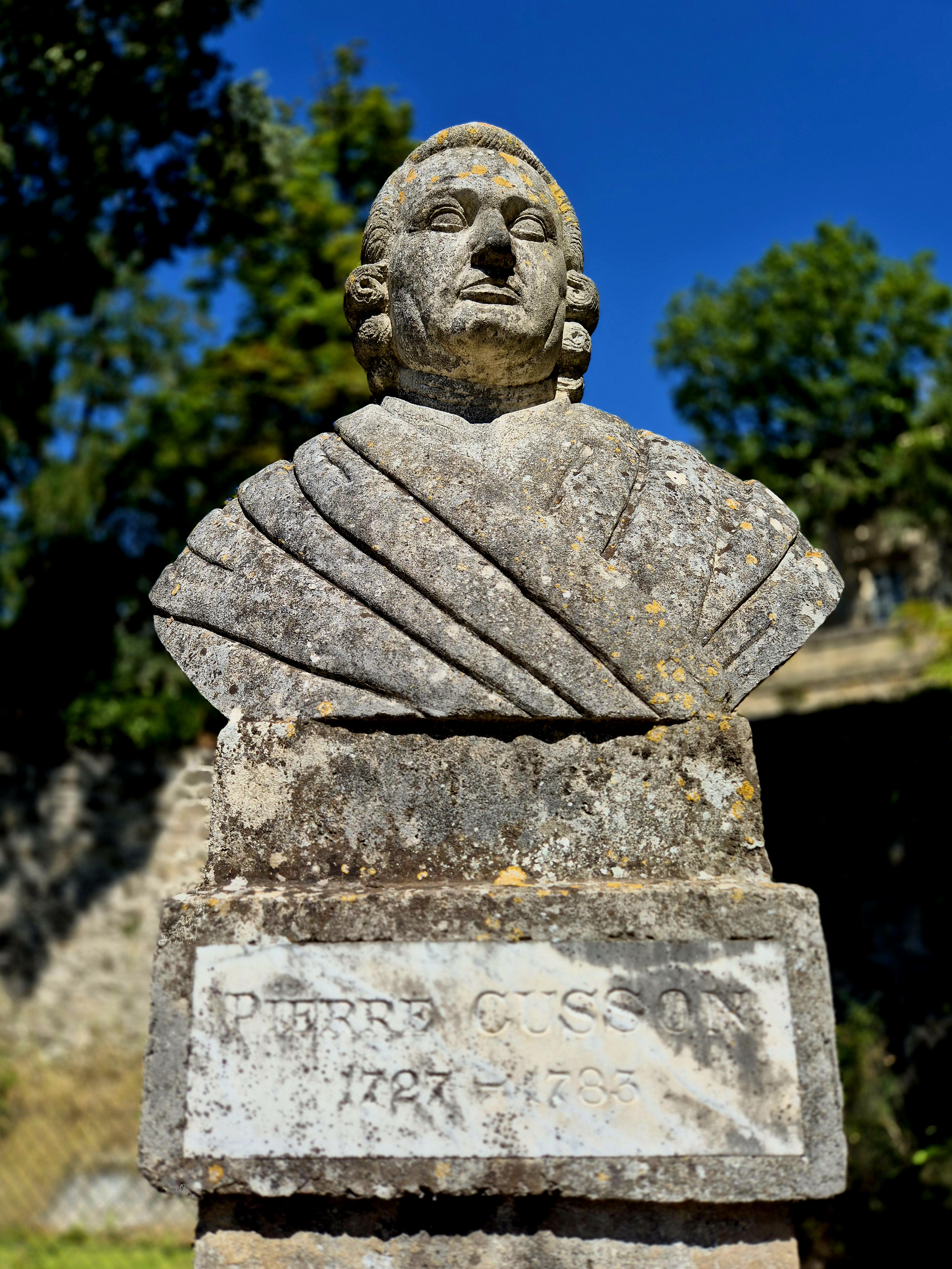
Bust of botanist Pierre Cusson in the Montpellier plant garden

Pierre Cusson (1727–1783), anglicised as Peter Cusson, was a French botanist who specialised in Umbelliferae. As a young man, he travelled through Majorca, Spain and the Pyrenees, building up an excellent specimen collection of the flora of those regions. Shortly after his return to his home in Montpellier, an elderly female relative with whom he lived cleaned his study in his absence, discarding his entire collection.

In 1967, botanist John Hutchinson published Neocussonia, a genus of flowering plants from southern Africa, belonging to the family Araliaceae and named in Pierre Cusson's honour.
