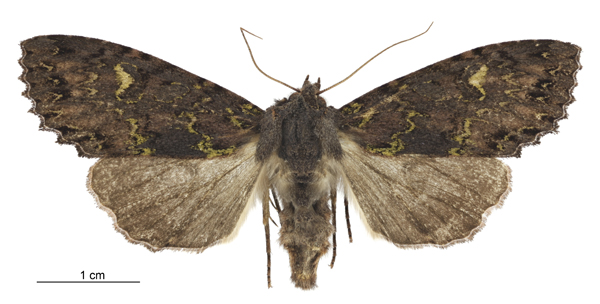
- Female
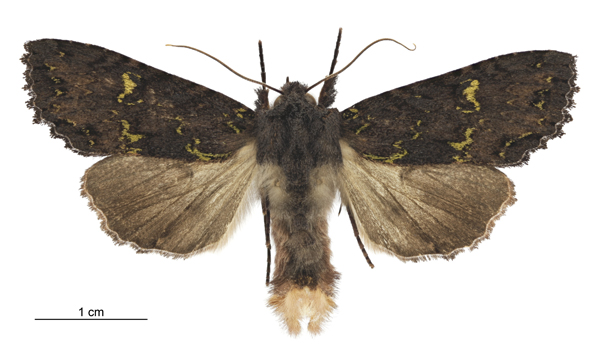
- Male

Scientific classification
- Kingdom: Animalia
- Phylum: Arthropoda
- Class: Insecta
- Order: Lepidoptera
- Superfamily: Noctuoidea
- Family: Noctuidae
- Genus: Meterana
- Species: M. merope

Binomial name
- Meterana merope (Hudson, 1898)

Synonyms
- Melanchra merope Hudson, 1898

= Meterana merope =

Species of moth endemic to New Zealand

Meterana merope, also known as the patē owlet, is a species of moth in the family Noctuidae. This species is endemic to New Zealand. The larvae of this species feed on pāte.
