= Plerandra costata =

Conservation status
- Vulnerable (IUCN 2.3)

Scientific classification
- Kingdom: Plantae
- Clade: Tracheophytes
- Clade: Angiosperms
- Clade: Eudicots
- Clade: Asterids
- Order: Apiales
- Family: Araliaceae
- Genus: Plerandra
- Species: P. costata

Binomial name
- Plerandra costata (A.C.Sm.) G.M.Plunkett, Lowry & Frodin (2013)

Synonyms
- Schefflera costata A.C.Sm. (1936)

Species of flowering plant

Plerandra costata is a species of plant in the family Araliaceae. It is endemic to Fiji. It is known from two mountain tops, Mount Tomanivi on Viti Levu and the western slope of Taveuni island, where it grows in montane rain forest above 900 meters elevation.
