= Isolona congolana =

Conservation status
- Least Concern (IUCN 3.1)

Scientific classification
- Kingdom: Plantae
- Clade: Embryophytes
- Clade: Tracheophytes
- Clade: Spermatophytes
- Clade: Angiosperms
- Clade: Magnoliids
- Order: Magnoliales
- Family: Annonaceae
- Genus: Isolona
- Species: I. congolana

Binomial name
- Isolona congolana (De Wild. & T.Durand) Engl. & Diels

Synonyms
- Monodora congolana De Wild. & T.Durand; Isolona maitlandii Keay

Species of flowering plant

Isolona congolana is a species of plant in the Annonaceae family. It is found in the Democratic Republic of the Congo and Uganda. It has also recently been found in southern Africa.
