= Crepinella simplex =

Scientific classification
- Kingdom: Plantae
- Clade: Tracheophytes
- Clade: Angiosperms
- Clade: Eudicots
- Clade: Asterids
- Order: Apiales
- Family: Araliaceae
- Genus: Crepinella
- Species: C. simplex

Binomial name
- Crepinella simplex (Steyerm. & Holst) G.M.Plunkett, Lowry & D.A.Neill (2019)

Synonyms
- Schefflera simplex Steyerm. & Holst (1988)

Species of flowering plant

Crepinella simplex is a species of flowering plant in the family Araliaceae native to northern Brazil (Amazonas state) and southern Venezuela (Amazonas province). It was first described as Schefflera simplex in 1988 by Julian Steyermark and E. C. Holst.
