= Uvariopsis korupensis =

Conservation status
- Endangered (IUCN 3.1)

Scientific classification
- Kingdom: Plantae
- Clade: Embryophytes
- Clade: Tracheophytes
- Clade: Spermatophytes
- Clade: Angiosperms
- Clade: Magnoliids
- Order: Magnoliales
- Family: Annonaceae
- Genus: Uvariopsis
- Species: U. korupensis

Binomial name
- Uvariopsis korupensis Gereau & Kenfack

Species of flowering plant

Uvariopsis korupensis is a species of flowering plant in the family Annonaceae endemic to Cameroon.

== Description ==
This shrub or small tree is of a height of 6 to 15 m, with a trunk of up to 14 cm in diameter. Young branches slightly velvet. Leaves coriaceous, glabrous, oblong-oblanceolate, 30–52 cm long, 9–14 cm broad. The inflorescence is fasciculate and the (cauliflorous) monoecious flowers are borne on a wooden collar at the base of the trunk (which sometimes extends up to 3.8 m from the base). Flowers orange and cream-coloured. Stigma glabrous, sessile. Fruit ellipsoid-cylindrical, 3–6 cm long, 1.8–3 cm thick. Seeds ellipsoid-oblong, 10–22 mm by 5–8 mm.

== Distribution ==
Endemic to Cameroon, the species grows in the south-west region on Mounts Cameroon, Korup, Bakossi and Takamanda. The plant grows in lowland evergreen forest in hilly terrain from 50 to 1,000 metres elevation on wet soils.

=== Threats ===
Uvariopsis korupensis is threatened by deforestation for agriculture and timber. Currently occupying an area of up to 36 square kilometres, it is in continuing decline due to the loss of its habitat.

== Uses ==
The leaves are wrapped around fish before cooking in the littoral provinces of Cameroon.

== See also ==
- Korup National Park
