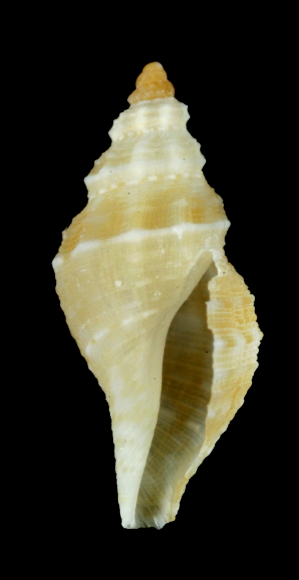
- Shell of Daphnella dilecta (specimen at MNHN, Paris)

Scientific classification
- Kingdom: Animalia
- Phylum: Mollusca
- Class: Gastropoda
- Subclass: Caenogastropoda
- Order: Neogastropoda
- Superfamily: Conoidea
- Family: Raphitomidae
- Genus: Daphnella
- Species: D. dilecta

Binomial name
- Daphnella dilecta Sarasúa, 1992

Synonyms
- Daphnella (Daphnella) elegantissima Espinosa & Fernández-Garcés, 1990(invalid; not Schepman, 1913); Daphnella elegantissima Espinosa & Fernández-Garcés, 1990

= Daphnella dilecta =

Species of gastropod

Daphnella dilecta also known as the Brown Striped Raphitoma is a species of sea snail, a marine gastropod mollusk in the family Raphitomidae.

== Description ==
The length of the shell attains 15 mm. The shell of this snail is elongated and tapers towards both ends. The color of the shell varies from white to light brown, with a series of brown spiral stripes. This snail is known for its distinct pattern and intricate design on the outer shell. the shell pattern of Daphnella dilecta is unique and no two organisms of this species will have the same shell pattern.

== Distribution ==
D. dilecta can be found in Caribbean waters, off the northwestern coast of Cuba. and the Grenadines.

== Diet ==
Daphnella Dilecta is a carnivorous snail that feeds on small marine invertebrates, including other snails, bivalves, and crustaceans. It uses its long siphon to detect prey, and then extends its proboscis to capture and consume its food.

== Behavior ==
Daphnella Dilecta is an active snail that moves along the ocean floor using its muscular foot. It is a nocturnal snail that feeds at night and hides during the day. This snail is primarily solitary, but it can sometimes be found in small groups. It is also known to burrow in the sand or hide under rocks to avoid predators.

== Mating ==
Daphnella Dilecta is a hermaphrodite, meaning it has both male and female reproductive organs. This snail reproduces sexually, and mating occurs when two snails come into contact with each other. After mating, the snails lay eggs that hatch into planktonic larvae.
