= Georg August Zenker =

German naturalist (1855–1922)

Georg August Zenker (11 June 1855 in Leipzig – 6 February 1922 in Bipindi) was a German gardener and naturalist.

He worked as a gardener at the botanical gardens in Leipzig and Naples, and in 1886, on behalf of the Italian government, traveled as a researcher to Africa. Subsequently, he was put in charge of the Sibange Farm, located near Libreville (Gabon), and later on, he worked as a preparator at Yaoundé Station in Kamerun. In 1895 he quit the colonial service and returned to Germany, but soon afterwards, he went back to Kamerun as a private citizen and established a plantation at Bipindi, where he grew coffee, cacao and rubber.

During his many years spent in Kamerun, he amassed an enormous collection of botanical, zoological and ethnographic items. Between 1912 and 1914 he issued the exsiccata-like plant specimen series Plantae Kamerunenses now deposited in several herbaria. Unfortunately, his botanical specimens sent to Berlin were for the most part destroyed during World War II. His name is associated with numerous plant and animal taxa; a few examples being:

- Zenkerella (family Fabaceae): a plant genus circumscribed by Paul Hermann Wilhelm Taubert.
- Zenker's fruit bat, Scotonycteris zenkeri, circumscribed by Paul Matschie.
- Zenker's honeyguide, Melignomon zenkeri, circumscribed by Anton Reichenow.
- Zenker's worm snake, Letheobia zenkeri, circumscribed by Richard Sternfeld.
