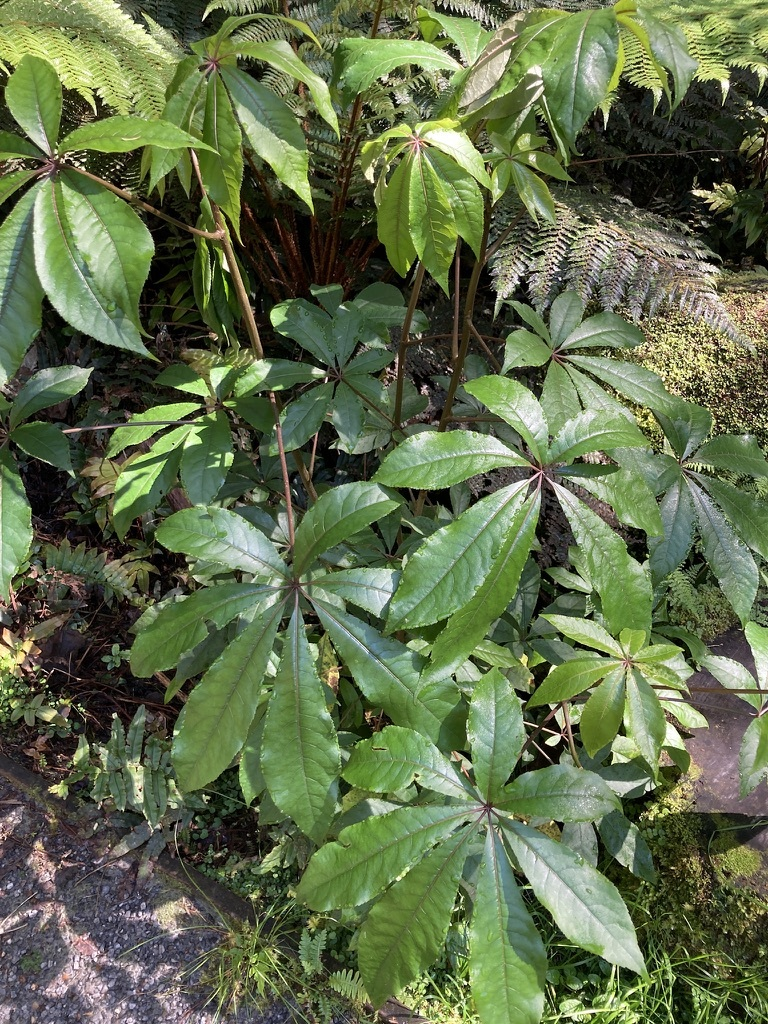
- Schefflera digitata

Scientific classification
- Kingdom: Plantae
- Clade: Tracheophytes
- Clade: Angiosperms
- Clade: Eudicots
- Clade: Asterids
- Order: Apiales
- Family: Araliaceae
- Subfamily: Aralioideae
- Genus: Schefflera; J.R.Forst. & G.Forst. (1775)

Diversity
- 13 species

= Schefflera =

Genus of plants

Schefflera /ˈʃɛflərə/ is a genus of flowering plants in the family Araliaceae with 13 species native to New Zealand and some Pacific islands.

The genus is named in honor of Johann Peter Ernst von Scheffler, physician and botanist of Gdańsk, and later of Warsaw, who contributed plants to Gottfried Reyger for Reyger's book, Tentamen Florae Gedanensis.

== Taxonomy ==
The circumscription of the genus has varied greatly. Phylogenetic studies have shown that the widely used broad circumscription was polyphyletic, so most of its hundreds of species have been reassigned to other genera. Molecular analyses have recovered five polyphyletic clades of Schefflera, all of which are geographically isolated from one another yet share similar traits indicating parallel evolution. These clades have been split into separate genera, primarily along geographical lines, with Schefflera now consisting of thirteen species restricted to New Zealand and some Pacific islands. The houseplant popularly known as "Schefflera" is now Heptapleurum arboricola.

The old Didymopanax Decne. & Planch., 1854 genus was resurrected in 2020 to welcome the 37 American species of Schefflera J.R. et G. Forst..

The genus has had a turbulent taxonomic history; the list of former synonyms includes:

- Actinomorphe (Miq.) Miq.
- Actinophyllum Ruiz & Pav.
- Agalma Miq.
- Astropanax Seem.
- Brassaia Endl.
- Cephaloschefflera (Harms) Merr.
- Crepinella Marchal
- Didymopanax Decne. & Planch.
- Geopanax Hemsl.
- Heptapleurum Gaertn.
- Neocussonia Hutch.
- Nesopanax Seem.
- Parapanax Miq.
- Paratropia (Blume) DC.
- Plerandra A.Gray
- Sciadophyllum P.Browne
- Tupidanthus Hook.f. & Thomson

== Species ==
13 species are currently accepted:

- Schefflera balansana Baill. – New Caledonia
- Schefflera candelabrum Baill. – New Caledonia
- Schefflera coenosa (R.Vig.) Frodin – southeastern New Caledonia, including Isle of Pines
- Schefflera digitata J.R.Forst. & G.Forst. – New Zealand
- Schefflera euthytricha A.C.Sm. – Fiji
- Schefflera kerchoveiana (Veitch ex W.Richards) Frodin & Lowry – Vanuatu
- Schefflera leratii R.Vig. – New Caledonia
- Schefflera neoebudica Guillaumin – Vanuatu
- Schefflera ouveana (Däniker) Frodin – New Caledonia (Loyalty Islands)
- Schefflera pseudocandelabrum R.Vig. – New Caledonia
- Schefflera samoensis (A.Gray) Harms – Samoa
- Schefflera vieillardii Baill. – New Caledonia
- Schefflera vitiensis (A.Gray) Seem. – Fiji

== Fossil record ==
Two fossil fruits of †Schefflera dorofeevii have been extracted from bore hole samples of the Middle Miocene fresh water deposits in Nowy Sacz Basin, West Carpathians, Poland.

== See also ==
- Astropanax
- Crepinella
- Didymopanax
- Heptapleurum
- Neocussonia
- Plerandra
- Sciadophyllum
