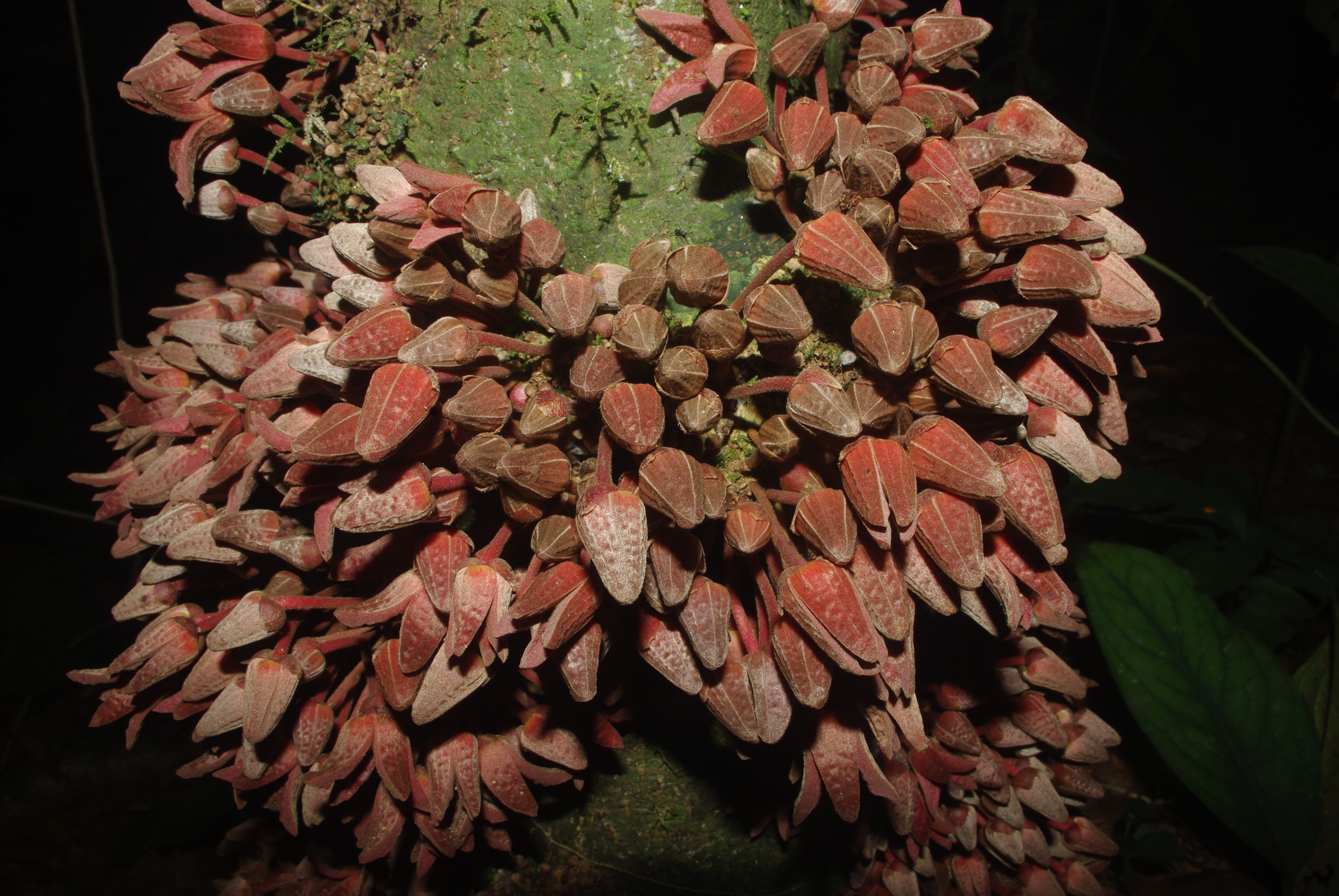

Conservation status
- Endangered (IUCN 3.1)

Scientific classification
- Kingdom: Plantae
- Clade: Embryophytes
- Clade: Tracheophytes
- Clade: Spermatophytes
- Clade: Angiosperms
- Clade: Magnoliids
- Order: Magnoliales
- Family: Annonaceae
- Genus: Uvariopsis
- Species: U. submontana

Binomial name
- Uvariopsis submontana Kenfack, Gosline & Gereau

= Uvariopsis submontana =

Species of flowering plant

Uvariopsis submontana is a species of plant in the Annonaceae family. It is endemic to Cameroon. Its natural habitat is subtropical or tropical moist lowland forests. It is threatened by habitat loss.
