= Zenkerella (plant) =

Scientific classification
- Kingdom: Plantae
- Clade: Tracheophytes
- Clade: Angiosperms
- Clade: Eudicots
- Clade: Rosids
- Order: Fabales
- Family: Fabaceae
- Subfamily: Detarioideae
- Tribe: Amherstieae
- Genus: Zenkerella; Taub. (1894)

Species
- See text

Synonyms
- Podogynium Taub. (1896)

Genus of legumes

Zenkerella is a genus of plants in the family Fabaceae. It includes six species of evergreen trees native to tropical Africa. One species (Zenkerella citrina) is native to Nigeria, Cameroon, and Gabon in west-central tropical Africa, where it grows in lowland, riverine, or swamp Guineo-Congolian forest. The other five species grow in Afromontane or coastal Zanzibar–Inhambane forest in Tanzania.

It contains the following species:

- Zenkerella capparidacea (Taub.) J.Leonard
- Zenkerella citrina Taub.
- Zenkerella egregia J.Leonard
- Zenkerella grotei (Harms) J.Leonard
- Zenkerella perplexa Temu
- Zenkerella schliebenii (Harms) J.Leonard (also called Cynometra schliebenii)
