= Jean Hector Paul Auguste Ghesquière =

Belgian botanist (1888-1982)

- Born: 1888
- Died: 1982 (aged 93–94)
- Scientific career
- Fields: Botany
- Author abbrev. (botany): Ghesq.

Jean Hector Paul Auguste Ghesquière (born 1888) was a Belgian botanist.

== Work ==
He collected plant specimens in Angola, the Democratic Republic of the Congo, Niger, São Tomé and Príncipe, and Uganda. He deposited many of his specimens in the herbarium at the Botanic Garden Meise (then called the National Botanic Garden of Belgium).

== Legacy ==
He is the authority for at least 59 taxa including: IPNI. List of plant names with authority Ghesq..
The following species have been named in his honor:

Karschiogomphus ghesquierei Schouteden, 1934 (Syn. of Neurogomphus martininus Lacroix, 1921)
Chlorocypha ghesquierei Fraser, 1959
