= David Gamman Frodin =

American botanist (1940–2019)

David Gamman Frodin (8 April 1940, Chicago – 12 August 2019, London, UK) was an American botanist, known as a leading expert on the flora of Papua New Guinea.

== Biography ==
His parents, Reuben Sanford Frodin Jr. (1912–2010) and Rebecca Durand Hayward (1911–1990), married in 1937 in Chicago. At the University of Chicago, Reuben S. Frodin Jr. studied law and Rebecca Hayward Durand studied linguistics. At age 11, David G. Frodin moved with his parents and sister from Chicago to Albany, New York, where he attended the Albany Academy for Boys. In 1957, his father received a Fulbright scholarship to teach at Australia's University of New South Wales. At age 17 David Frodin enrolled at the Sydney Boys High School, where he studied for a year and developed an interest in tropical flora. He received in 1963 his bachelor's degree in botany from the University of Chicago. He received two master of science degrees in botany: the first in 1964 from the University of Tennessee and the second in 1965 from the University of Liverpool.

From October 1965 to October 1966, Frodin worked as a scientific officer in Papua New Guinea at the Lae Herbarium under the auspices of the Division of Botany, Office of Forests of the colonial Australian administration. In Papua New Guinea he travelled to the provinces of Sandaun, Madang, Morobe, Southern Highlands, and West New Britain, as well as the Autonomous Region of Bougainville, and collected about 1000 botanical specimens. He was a member of the Tari Subdistrict Expedition in 1966 from June 17th to September 16th with Andrew N. Gillison, Cornelis Kalkman, and Willem Vink. After the expiration of his contract with the Division of Botany, Office of Forests, Frodin visited Australian herbaria and made short field trips in Australia and the Far East until June 1967. In 1967, he received a scholarship for doctoral study at the University of Cambridge. There he received in November 1970 his doctorate in botany with dissertation The complex of Cephaloschefflera in Schefflera under the supervision of E. J. H. Corner.

After completing his doctorate, Frodin was from 1971 to 1985 a staff member of the botany department of the University of Papua New Guinea (UPNG), at Boroko.

In 1983 Frodin was appointed an associate professor in botany at UPNG, but he developed a serious medical condition. In 1984 Cambridge University Press published the first edition of his Guide to Standard Floras of the World. In 1985 he returned to the United States as a research associate under Benjamin Clemens Stone in the botany department of the Philadelphia Academy of Natural Science. After a few years Frodin became the botany department's collections manager, but in 1989 Frodin's departmental position was eliminated. From 1989 to 1993 he took various assignments in the United Kingdom, Malaysia, and Papua New Guinea. In 1993 he was appointed a senior scientific officer at the herbarium of the Royal Botanic Gardens, Kew. In 1994 he had a heart attack followed by quadruple bypass surgery, but he recovered and remained highly productive.

In 2000 Frodin was forced to retire at age 60 from his salaried position at Kew, but for the rest of his of life he continued at Kew as an honorary research associate. For the 2001 publication of the 2nd edition of Guide to Standard Floras of the World, he was awarded the 2002 Engler Medal in Silver by the International Association of Plant Taxonomy. From 2005 to 2009 he was employed as a scientific advisor to the Chelsea Physic Garden.

Frodin received the commendation as the most productive taxonomist of the year 2018 at the Kew Science Away Day for the book The genus Schefflera in Sabah, Malaysian Borneo co-authored with Aida Shafreena Ahmed Puad and Todd J. Barkman.

== Eponyms ==
- (Araliaceae) Frodinia Lowry & G.M.Plunkett
- (Araliaceae) Aralia frodiniana J.Wen
- (Araliaceae) Schefflera frodiniana Bernardi
- (Euphorbiaceae) Glochidion frodinii Airy Shaw
- (Euphorbiaceae) Phyllanthus frodinii Airy Shaw
- (Lauraceae) Cinnamomum frodinii Kosterm.
- (Melastomataceae) Medinilla frodinii Bodegom
- (Rubiaceae) Psychotria frodinii Sohmer

== Selected publications ==
=== Articles ===
- Frodin, D. G. (1975). "Studies in Schefflera (Araliaceae): The Cephaloschefflera Complex". Journal of the Arnold Arboretum. 56 (4): 427–448. doi:10.5962/p.185857. JSTOR 43782659. S2CID 145874437.
- Frodin, D. G. (1976). "On the Style of Floras: some general considerations" (PDF). Gardens Bulletin, Singapore. XXIX: 239–250.
- Frodin, D. G.; Gressitt, J. L. (1982). "Biological exploration of New Guinea". Biogeography and Ecology of New Guinea. Monographiae Biologicae. Vol. 42. pp. 87–130. doi:10.1007/978-94-009-8632-9_6. ISBN 978-94-009-8634-3.
- Short, P. S., ed. (1990). "Explorers, institutions and outside influences: botany north of Thursday by D. G. Frodin". History of systematic botany in Australasia : proceedings of a symposium held at the University of Melbourne, 25-27 May 1988. South Yarra, Victoria: Australian Systematic Botany Society. pp. 193–215.
- Johnstone, I. M.; Frodin, D. G. (1982). "Mangroves of the Papuan Subregion". Biogeography and Ecology of New Guinea. Monographiae Biologicae. Vol. 42. pp. 513–528. doi:10.1007/978-94-009-8632-9_22. ISBN 978-94-009-8634-3.
- Reveal, James L., ed. (1996). "Chapter 5. Commentaries. Commentary 2. Biological Nomenclature by David Frodin". Proceedings of a Mini-Symposium on Biological Nomenclature in the 21st Century held at the University of Maryland on 4 November 1996.
- Mitchell, A. D.; Frodin, D. G.; Heads, M. J. (1997). "Reinstatement of Raukaua, a genus of the Araliaceae centred in New Zealand". New Zealand Journal of Botany. 35 (3): 309–315. Bibcode:1997NZJB...35..309M. doi:10.1080/0028825x.1997.10410156.
- Wen, Jun; Frodin, David G. (2001). "Metapanax, a new genus of Araliaceae from China and Vietnam". Brittonia. 53 (1): 116–121. Bibcode:2001Britt..53..116W. doi:10.1007/BF02805403. S2CID 35394996.
- Frodin, David G. (2004). "History and Concepts of Big Plant Genera". Taxon. 53 (3): 753–776. Bibcode:2004Taxon..53..753F. doi:10.2307/4135449. JSTOR 4135449.
- Plunkett, Gregory M.; Lowry, Porter P.; Frodin, David G.; Wen, Jun (2005). "Phylogeny and Geography of Schefflera: Pervasive Polyphyly in the Largest Genus of Araliaceae". Annals of the Missouri Botanical Garden. 92 (2): 202–224. JSTOR 3298514.
- Fiaschi, Pedro; Frodin, David G.; Plunkett, Gregory M. (2008). "Four new species of the Didymopanax group of Schefflera (Araliaceae) from the Brazilian Amazon". Brittonia. 60 (3): 274–286. Bibcode:2008Britt..60..274F. doi:10.1007/s12228-008-9025-0. S2CID 22300850.
- Frodin, David G.; Lowry II, Porter P.; Plunkett, Gregory M. (2010). "Schefflera (Araliaceae): taxonomic history, overview and progress". Plant Diversity and Evolution. 128 (3): 561–595. doi:10.1127/1869-6155/2010/0128-0028.
- Lowry, Porter P.; Plunkett, Gregory M.; Frodin, David G. (2013). "Revision of Plerandra (Araliaceae). I. A synopsis of the genus with an expanded circumscription and a new infrageneric classification". Brittonia. 65 (1): 42–61. Bibcode:2013Britt..65...42L. doi:10.1007/s12228-012-9260-2. S2CID 23956490.
- Plunkett, Gregory M.; Lowry, Porter P.; Fiaschi, Pedro; Frodin, David G.; Nicolas, Antoine N. (2019). "Phylogeny, biogeography, and morphological evolution among and within the Neotropical and Asian clades of Schefflera (Araliaceae)". Taxon. 68 (6): 1278–1313. Bibcode:2019Taxon..68.1278P. doi:10.1002/tax.12177. S2CID 214109057.
- Shee, Zhi Qiang; Frodin, David G.; Cámara-Leret, Rodrigo; Pokorny, Lisa (2020). "Reconstructing the Complex Evolutionary History of the Papuasian Schefflera Radiation Through Herbariomics". Frontiers in Plant Science. 11: 258. doi:10.3389/fpls.2020.00258. PMC 7099051. PMID 32265950.
- Cámara-Leret, Rodrigo; et al. (2020). "New Guinea has the world's richest island flora". Nature. 584 (7822): 579–583. Bibcode:2020Natur.584..579C. doi:10.1038/s41586-020-2549-5. hdl:11449/195568. PMID 32760001. S2CID 220980697.

=== Books ===
- World Checklist and Bibliography of Magnoliaceae. Royal Botanic Gardens. 1996. ISBN 9781900347075.
- World Checklist and Bibliography of Euphorbiaceae (With Pandaceae). Royal Botanic Gardens, Kew. 2000. ISBN 9781900347839.
- World Checklist and Bibliography of Sapotaceae. Royal Botanic Gardens. 2001. ISBN 9781900347945.
- Frodin, David G. (14 June 2001). Guide to Standard Floras of the World: An Annotated, Geographically Arranged Systematic Bibliography of the Principal Floras, Enumerations, Checklists and Chorological Atlases of Different Areas (2nd ed.). Cambridge University Press. ISBN 9781139428651.
