= Aralia californica =

- Aralia californica in Santa Cruz County, California

Scientific classification
- Kingdom: Plantae
- Clade: Tracheophytes
- Clade: Angiosperms
- Clade: Eudicots
- Clade: Asterids
- Order: Apiales
- Family: Araliaceae
- Genus: Aralia
- Species: A. californica

Binomial name
- Aralia californica S. Watson.

Species of flowering plant

Aralia californica, known by the common name elk clover, California aralia and California spikenard is a large deciduous perennial herb native to California and Oregon in the family Araliaceae. It occurs primarily in moist, shaded habitats such as streambanks, canyons and mixed forests. The plant can reach 2-3 m in height and produces very large compound leaves. It has small, greenish-white flowers that occur in branched clusters, followed by dark purple to black fruits.

== Description ==
It is a deciduous, herbaceous, perennial plant growing to a height of 2–3 m on stems which are thick but not woody. The stems bear large green pinnately compound or tri-pinnately compound leaves 1–2 m long and 1 m broad, the leaflets 15–30 cm long and 7–15 cm broad. The leaflets are arranged opposite with an odd terminal leaflet. The greenish white flowers are produced in large compound racemes of umbels 30–45 cm in diameter at the stem apex; each flower is 2–3 mm in diameter, and matures to small (3–5 mm) dark purple or black fruit, each berry containing 3–5 seeds.

It is distributed throughout western and central California and into Oregon. It is more common in cooler, moister areas in northern California, especially in the San Francisco Bay Area. Birds eat the plant's berries.

This plant is sometimes substituted for other species of its genus which are used as herbal remedies, such as American spikenard and Japanese spikenard. A preparation of the root has traditionally been used as an anti-inflammatory, a cough suppressant, and to treat arthritis.

The Concow tribe call the plant mâl-ē-mē' (Konkow language).

Massive leaves of A. californica

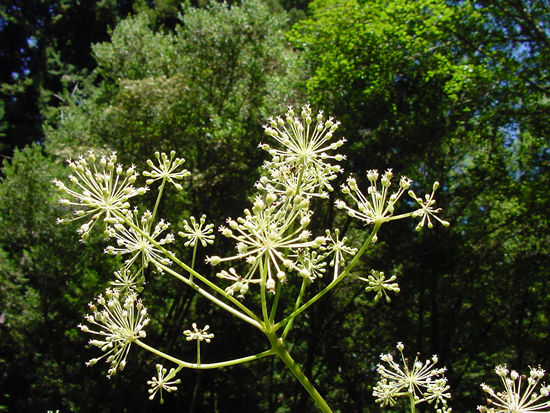
The flowers

Branched, fruiting inflorescence

== Propagation ==
Freshly collected seeds can be directly sown into soil, and are expected to germinate in 60 days. Dried seed requires 2-3 months cold stratification.
