= Petty morel =

Petty morel is a common name for several plants and may refer to:

- Solanum nigrum, black nightshade, a Eurasian plant
- Aralia racemosa, an American plant of ornamental value

Petty morel is an unarmed woody rhizomatous perennial plant distinguished from wild sarsaparilla by more aromatic roots and panicled umbels. They are mostly found in southeastern North America to Mexico.
