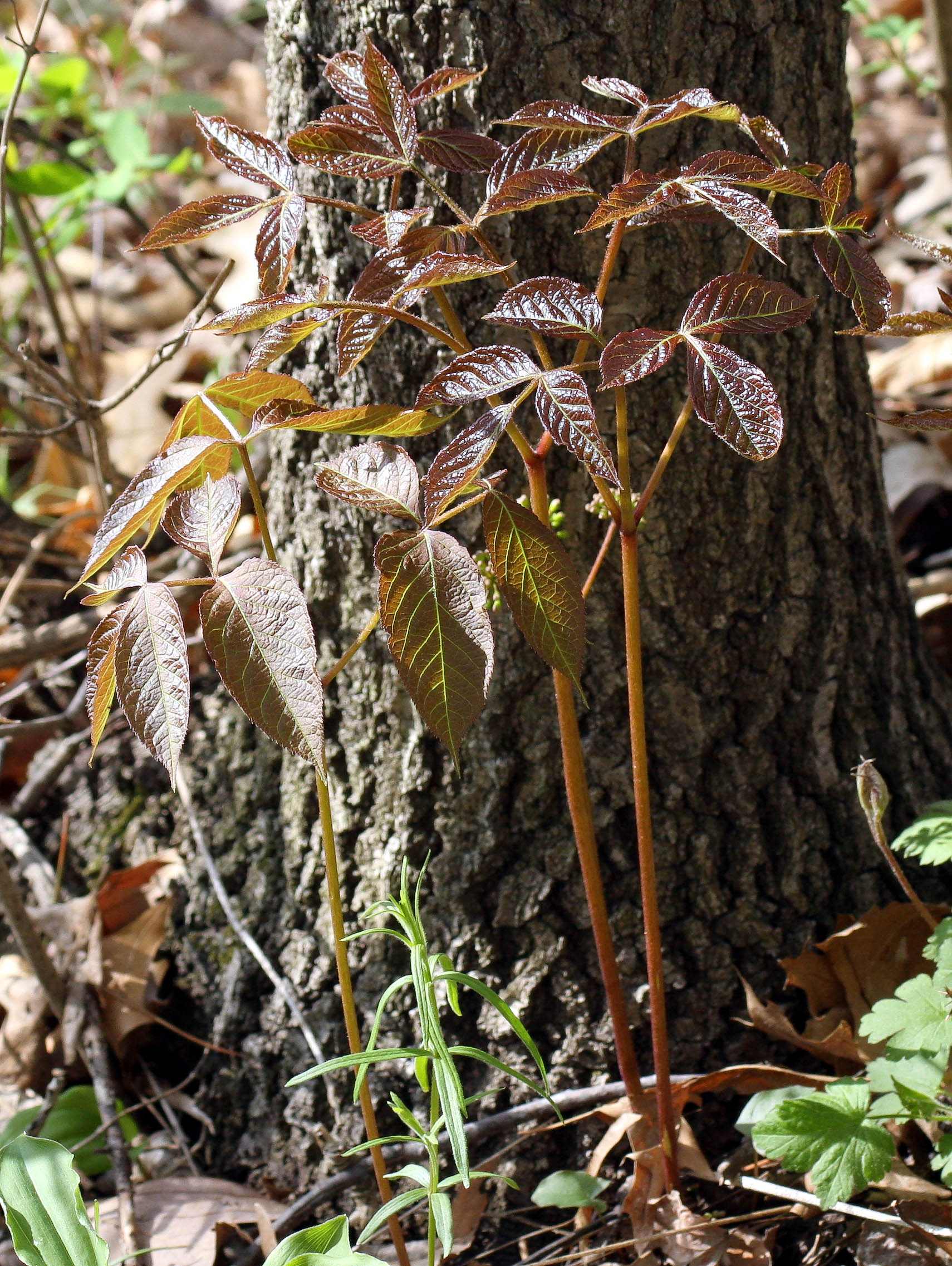

Conservation status
- Secure (NatureServe)

Scientific classification
- Kingdom: Plantae
- Clade: Tracheophytes
- Clade: Angiosperms
- Clade: Eudicots
- Clade: Asterids
- Order: Apiales
- Family: Araliaceae
- Genus: Aralia
- Species: A. nudicaulis

Binomial name
- Aralia nudicaulis L.

Synonyms
- List: Aralia nudicaulis f. abortiva Dans.; Aralia nudicaulis f. depauperata Vict.; Aralia nudicaulis var. elongata Nash; Aralia nudicaulis f. prolifera (Apgar) Britton; Aralia nudicaulis var. prolifera Apgar; Aralia nudicaulis f. virescens Vict. & J.Rousseau

= Aralia nudicaulis =

Wild sarsaparilla

Species of flowering plant

Aralia nudicaulis (commonly wild sarsaparilla, false sarsaparilla, shot bush, small spikenard, wild liquorice, and rabbit root) is a species of flowering plant in the ivy family Araliaceae. It is native to northern and eastern North America.

== Description ==
Aralia nudicaulis is a herbaceous perennial plant with creeping underground stems. In the spring the underground stems produce compound leaves that are large and finely toothed. Tiny white flowers, typically in three, globe-shaped clusters 4–5 cm (1 1/2–2 in) wide, are produced on tall scapes that grow about the same height as the leaves, about 30–60 cm (12–24 in) high. The flowers bloom from May to July and develop into purple-black edible berries. The leaves go dormant in summer before the fruits ripen. The berries taste a little spicy and sweet.

The stem of the plant grows straight up from the ground and divides into a whorl of three pinnately compound leaves with 3 to 7 (most often 5) leaflets arranged on either side of a central stalk. The leaflets are ovate, acute, serrate, and green. Technically, all the leaflets on one plant are considered to be one entire leaf, and the stems that connect the leaflets are called rachis; this arrangement is called doubly compound. In some cases some of the leaflets are further completely subdivided, forming a triply compound pattern.

=== Similar species ===
Aralia nudicaulis is similar to Aralia hispida (bristly sarsaparilla), which is a little larger with stems covered with bristly hairs, hence the name. The stems of A. nudicaulis are smooth.

Aralia nudicaulis is sometimes called fool's sang since it is often confused with American ginseng (Panax quinquefolius), another member of the ivy family (Araliaceae). The two species may be distinguished by their leaves. As described above, Aralia nudicaulis has pinnately compound leaves while Panax quinquefolius has palmately compound leaves (with leaflets radiating from a single point).

Because it sometimes grows with groups of 3 leaflets, it can be mistaken for poison ivy. Wild sarsaparilla lacks a woody base and has fine teeth along the edges of the leaves.

== Taxonomy ==
The first scientific name for Aralia nudicaulis was published by Carl Linnaeus in his landmark Species Plantarum in 1753.

== Distribution and habitat ==
This plant is so common in certain ecologies that it is an indicator species for these Eastern forests of North America: northern hardwood forest, beech–maple forest, and oak–hickory forest. It is also common in the interior cedar–hemlock forest ecosystem in central and southern British Columbia.

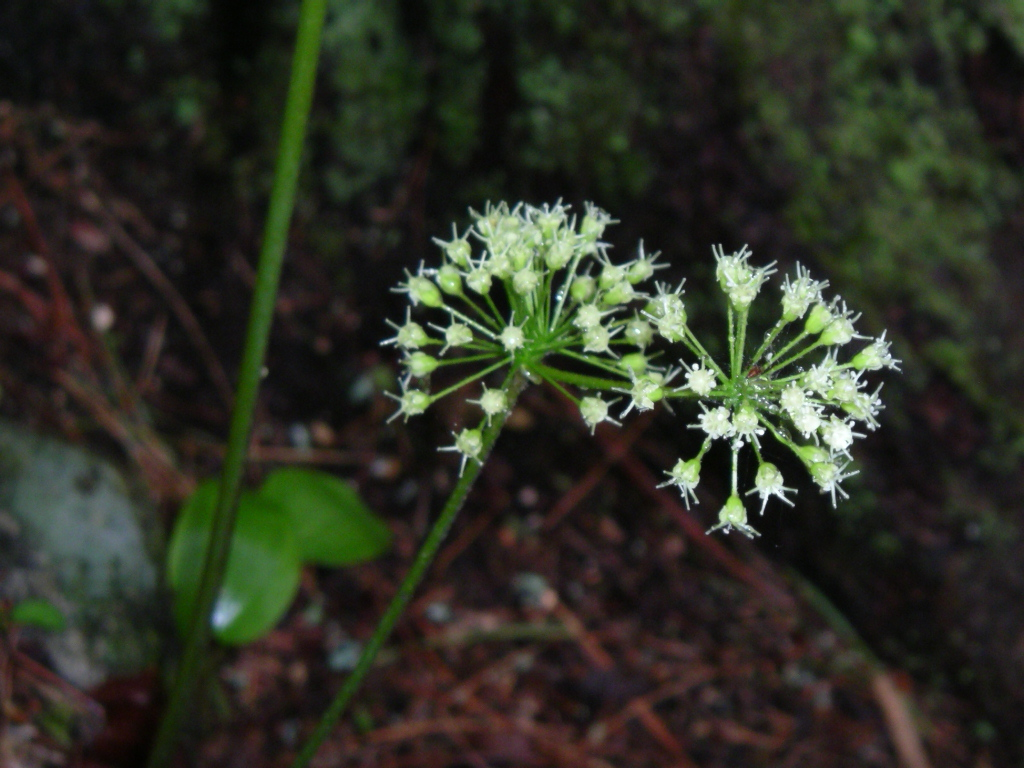
Flowers

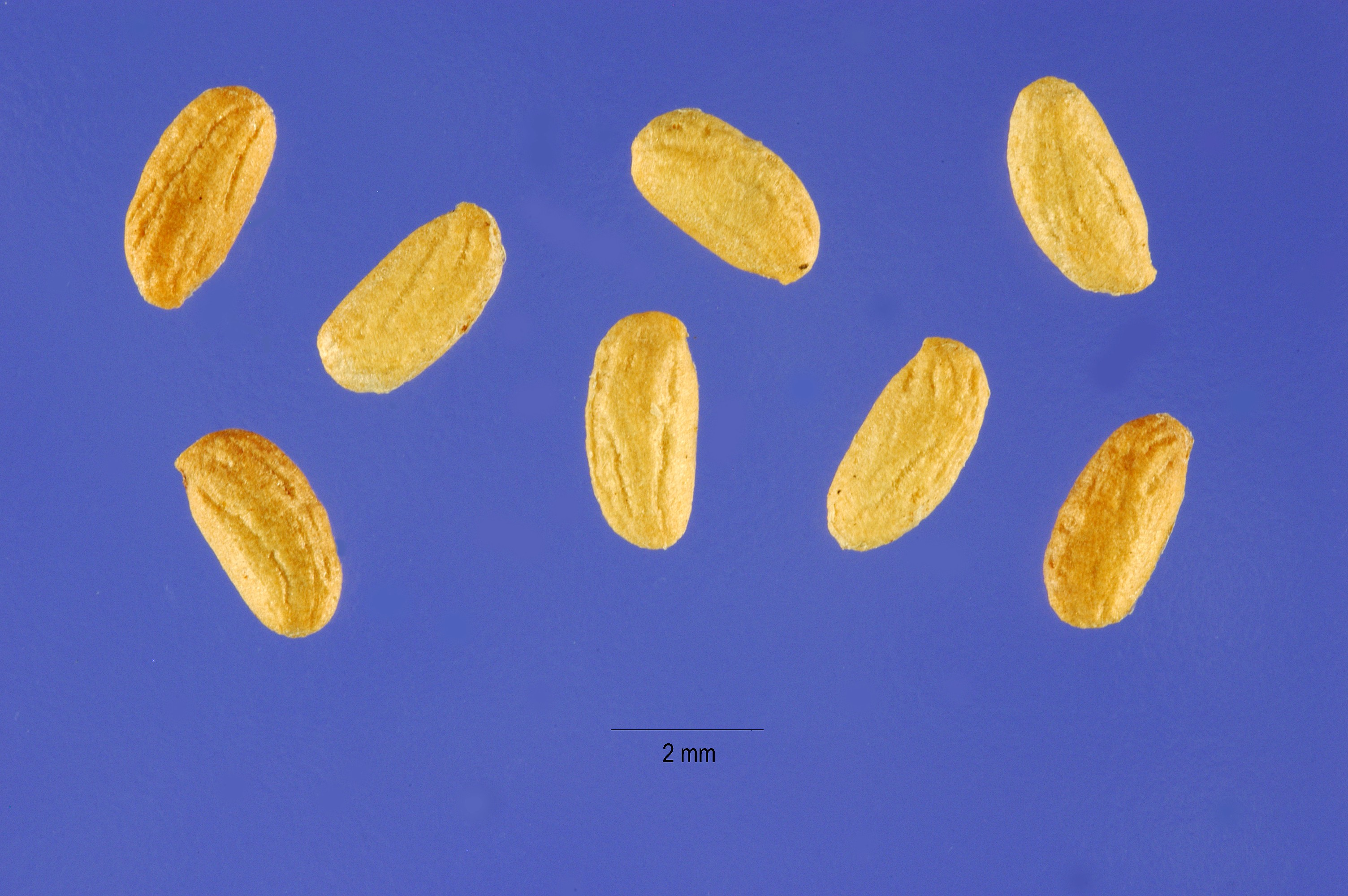
Seeds

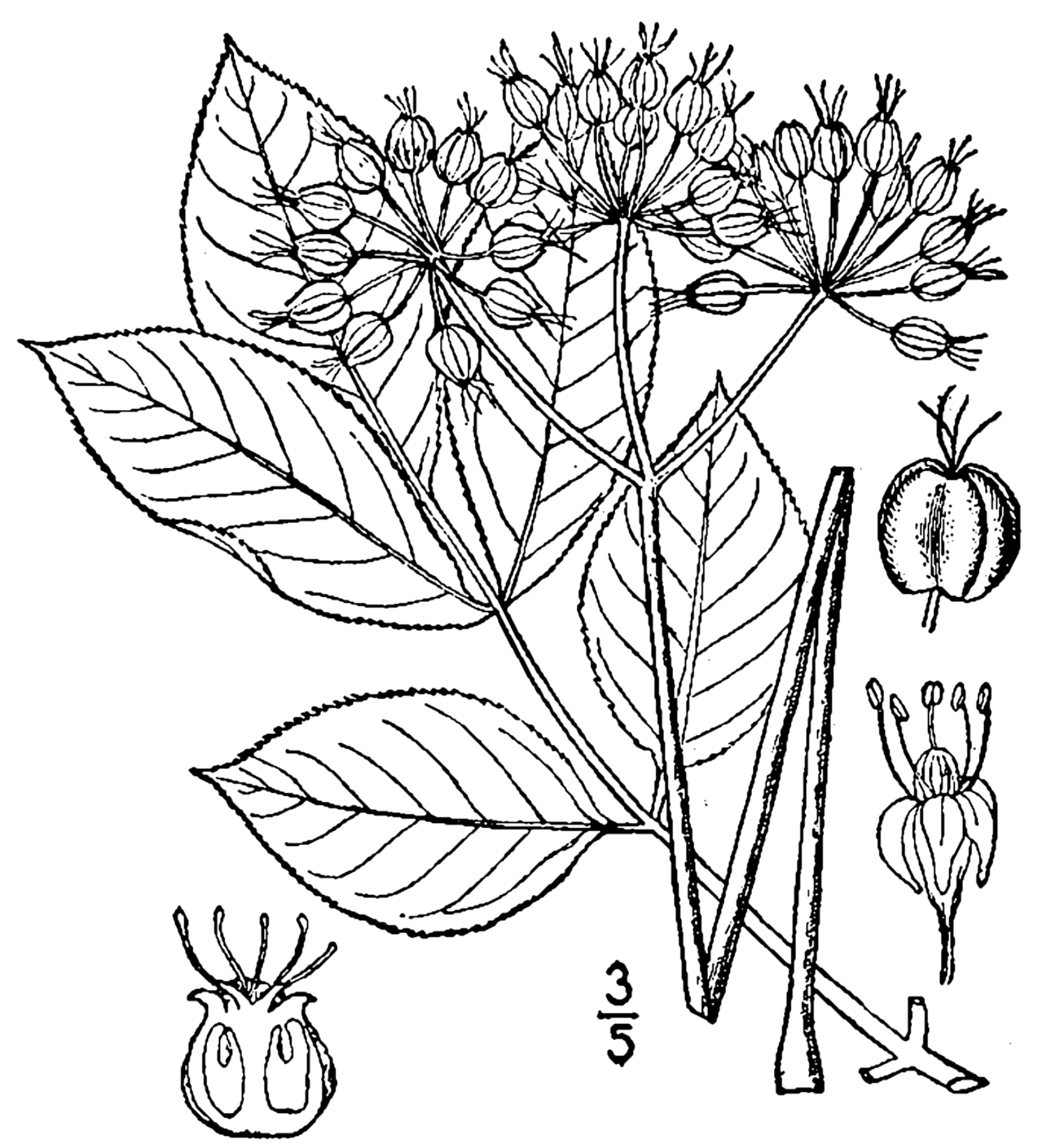
Illustration

== Uses ==
The berry can be eaten but is unexceptional. The roots have been used as substitutes for true sarsaparilla (Smilax sp.) in herbal medicine.
