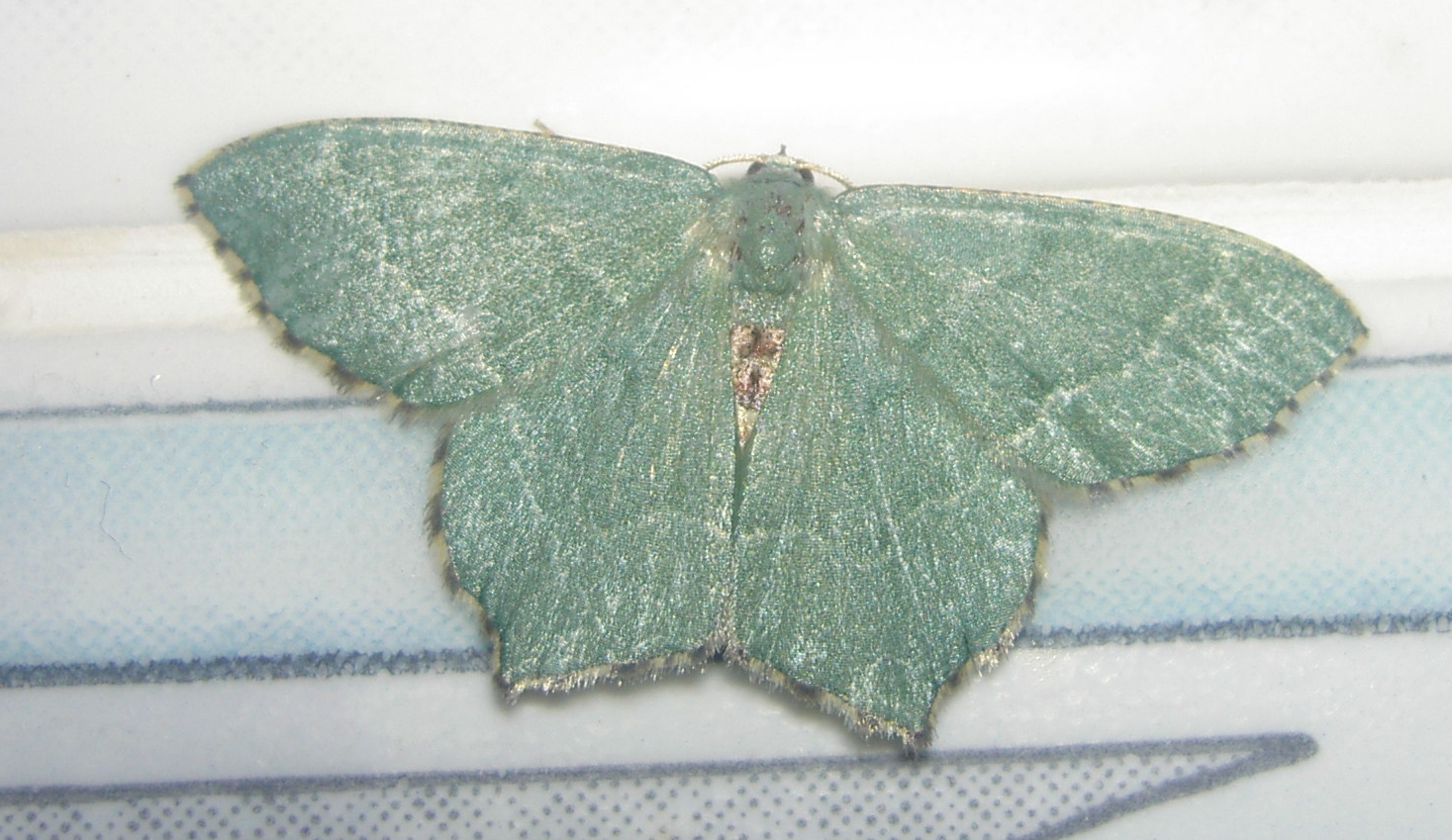

Scientific classification
- Kingdom: Animalia
- Phylum: Arthropoda
- Clade: Pancrustacea
- Class: Insecta
- Order: Lepidoptera
- Family: Geometridae
- Genus: Hemithea
- Species: H. aestivaria

Binomial name
- Hemithea aestivaria (Hübner, 1799)

= Common emerald =

Species of moth

The common emerald (Hemithea aestivaria) is a moth of the family Geometridae. The species is found throughout the Nearctic and Palearctic regions and the Near East. It is mostly commonly found in the southern half of Ireland and Britain. It was accidentally introduced into southern British Columbia in 1973.

== Description ==
All wings are generally soft grey-green with grey and white chequered fringes and narrow white fascia, two on the forewing, one on the hindwing. The green colouration tends not to fade over time as much as in other emeralds. The hindwings have a sharply angled termen giving the moth a very distinctive shape. The wingspan is 30–35 mm.

== Biology ==
It flies at dusk and night in June and July and will come to light.

The larva is green with reddish-brown markings and black v-shaped marks along the back. The young larva will feed on most plants but later it feeds on trees and shrubs. The species overwinters as a larva.

1. The flight season refers to the British Isles. This may vary in other parts of the range.

== Recorded food plants ==
- Aralia
- Artemisia
- Betula – birch
- Camellia
- Carpinus – hornbeam
- Castanea – chestnut
- Citrus
- Corylus – hazel
- Crataegus - hawthorn
- Diervilla – bush honeysuckle
- Hypericum – St John's wort
- Juglans – walnut
- Larix – larch
- Ligustrum – privet
- Malus – apple
- Morus – mulberry
- Photinia
- Prunus
- Quercus – oak
- Rhamnus – buckthorn
- Ribes – currant
- Rosa – rose
- Rubus
- Salix – willow
- Sorbus – rowan
- Tilia – lime
- Vaccinium
- Viburnum

== Gallery ==
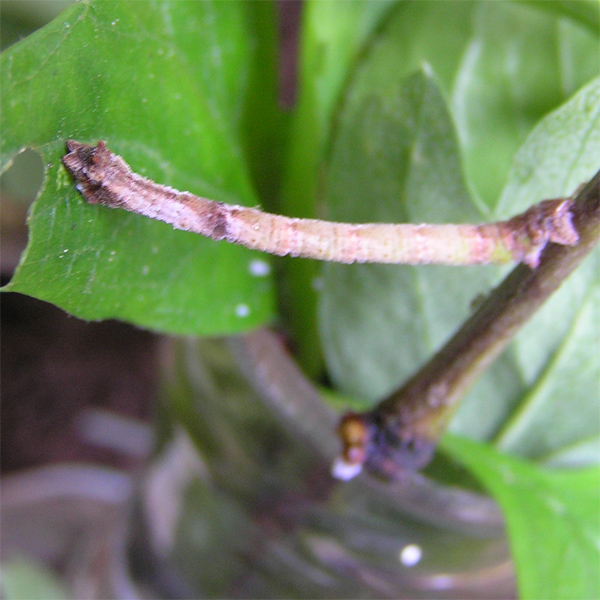
Larva

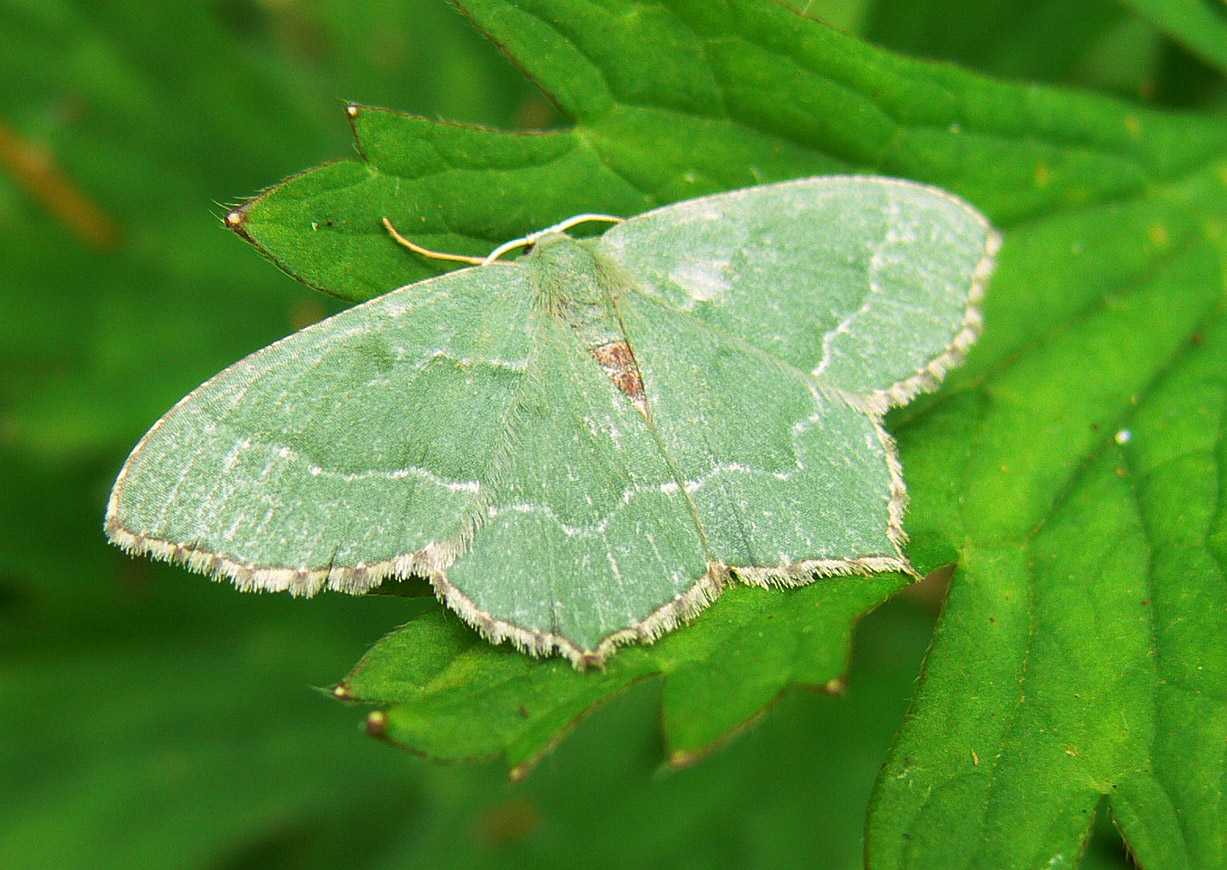
At rest

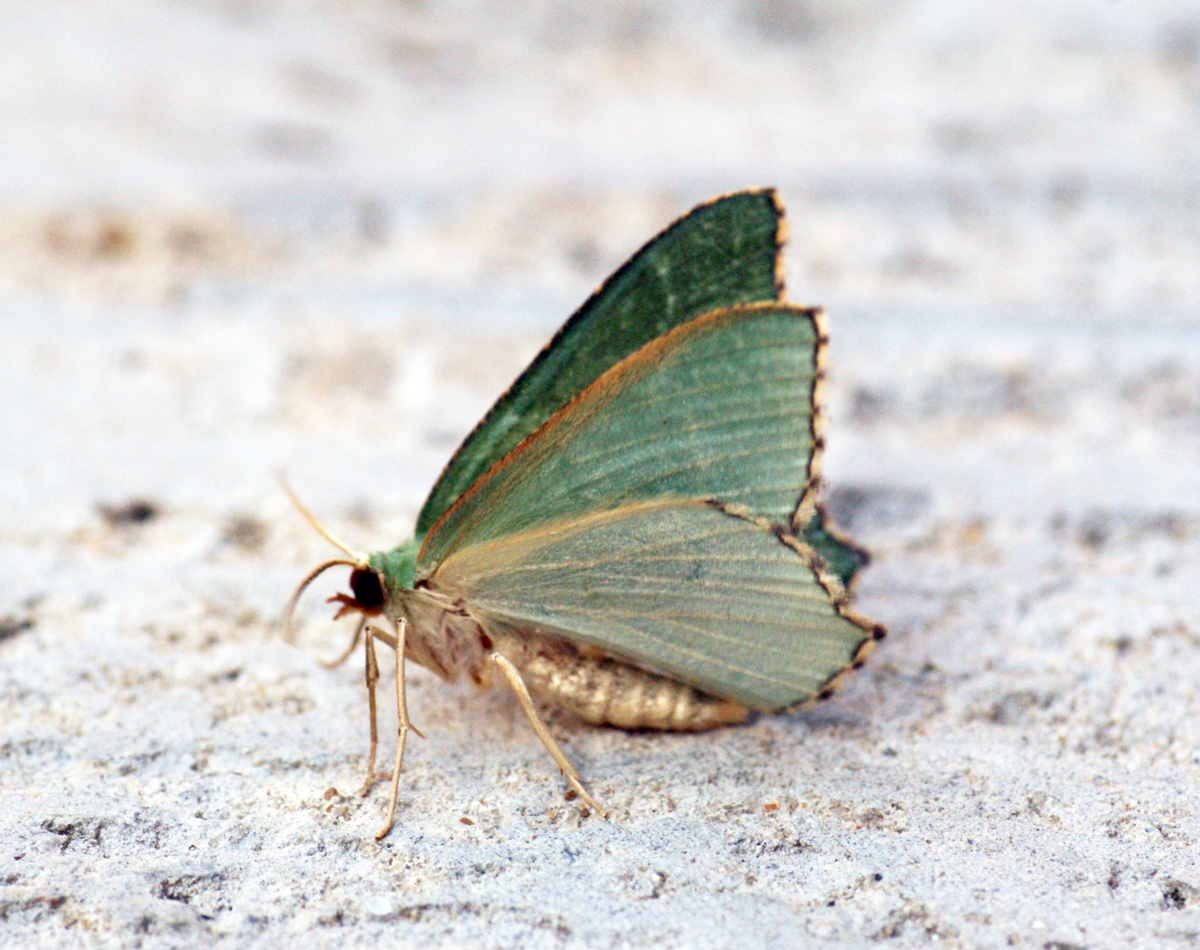
Ventral view

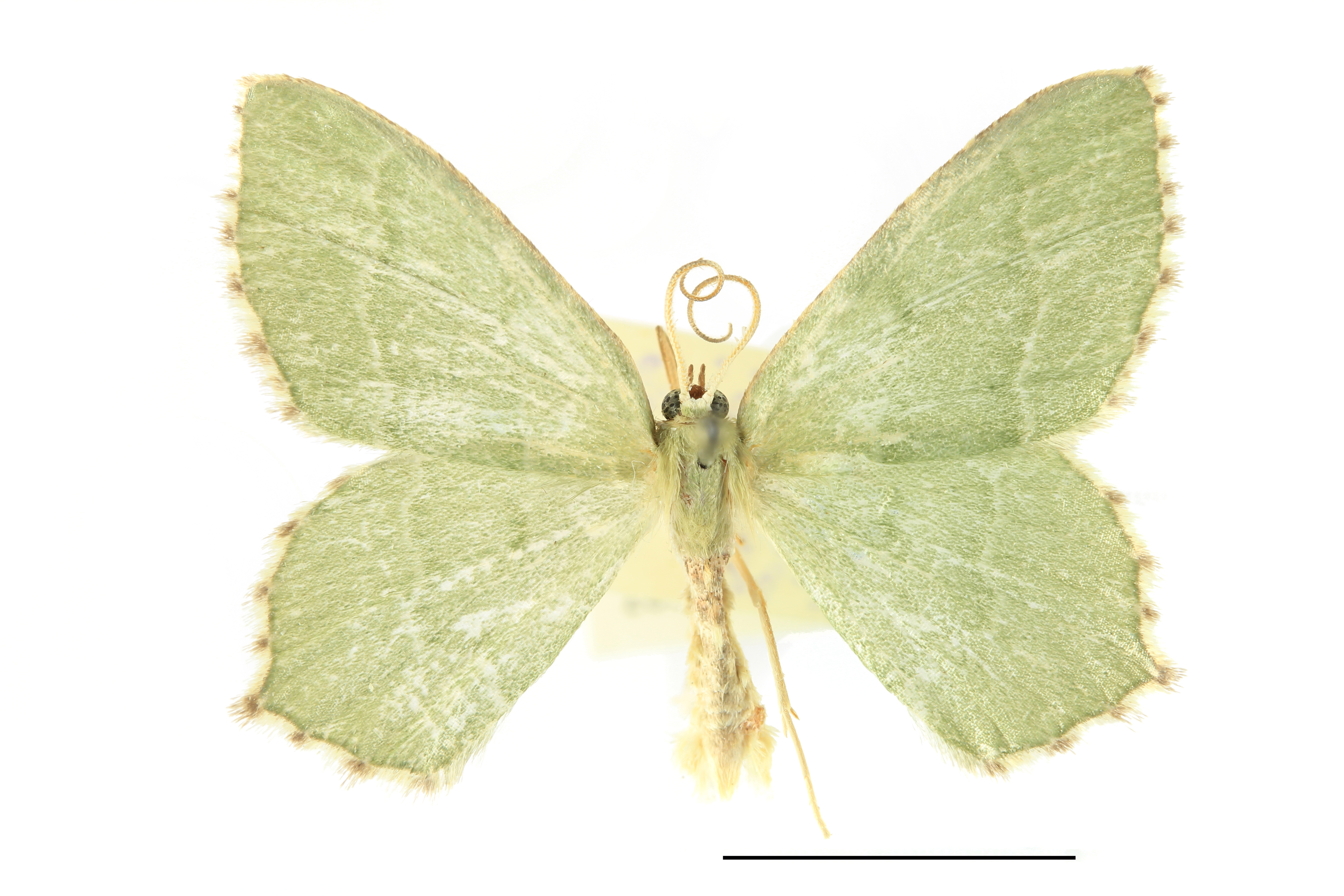
Museum specimen

== Synonymy ==
- Phalaena aestivaria Hübner, 1789
- Phalaena strigata Müller,
- Phalaena vernaria Esper, 1795
- Nemoria alboundulata Hedemann, 1879
- krajniki Komarek, 1950
