= Aralia wangshanensis =

Conservation status
- Conservation Dependent (IUCN 2.3)

Scientific classification
- Kingdom: Plantae
- Clade: Tracheophytes
- Clade: Angiosperms
- Clade: Eudicots
- Clade: Asterids
- Order: Apiales
- Family: Araliaceae
- Genus: Aralia
- Species: A. wangshanensis

Binomial name
- Aralia wangshanensis (W.C.Cheng) Y.F.Deng

Synonyms
- Aralia franchetii J.Wen, nom. illeg.; Pentapanax henryi Harms; Pentapanax henryi var. fangii G.Hoo; Pentapanax henryi var. wangshanensis W.C.Cheng; Pentapanax lanceolatus G.Hoo

Species of plant

Aralia wangshanensis is a species of plant in the family Araliaceae. It is endemic to China.

== Taxonomy ==
The species was first described by Hermann Harms in 1896 as Pentapanax henryi. When it was transferred to the genus Aralia, the name "Aralia henryi" was already in use for a different species, so a replacement name was needed. The first legitimate name published in Aralia was Aralia wangshanensis, published by Yun Fei Deng in 2019, based on Pentapanax henryi var. wangshanensis, first published by Wan Chung Cheng in 1934.
