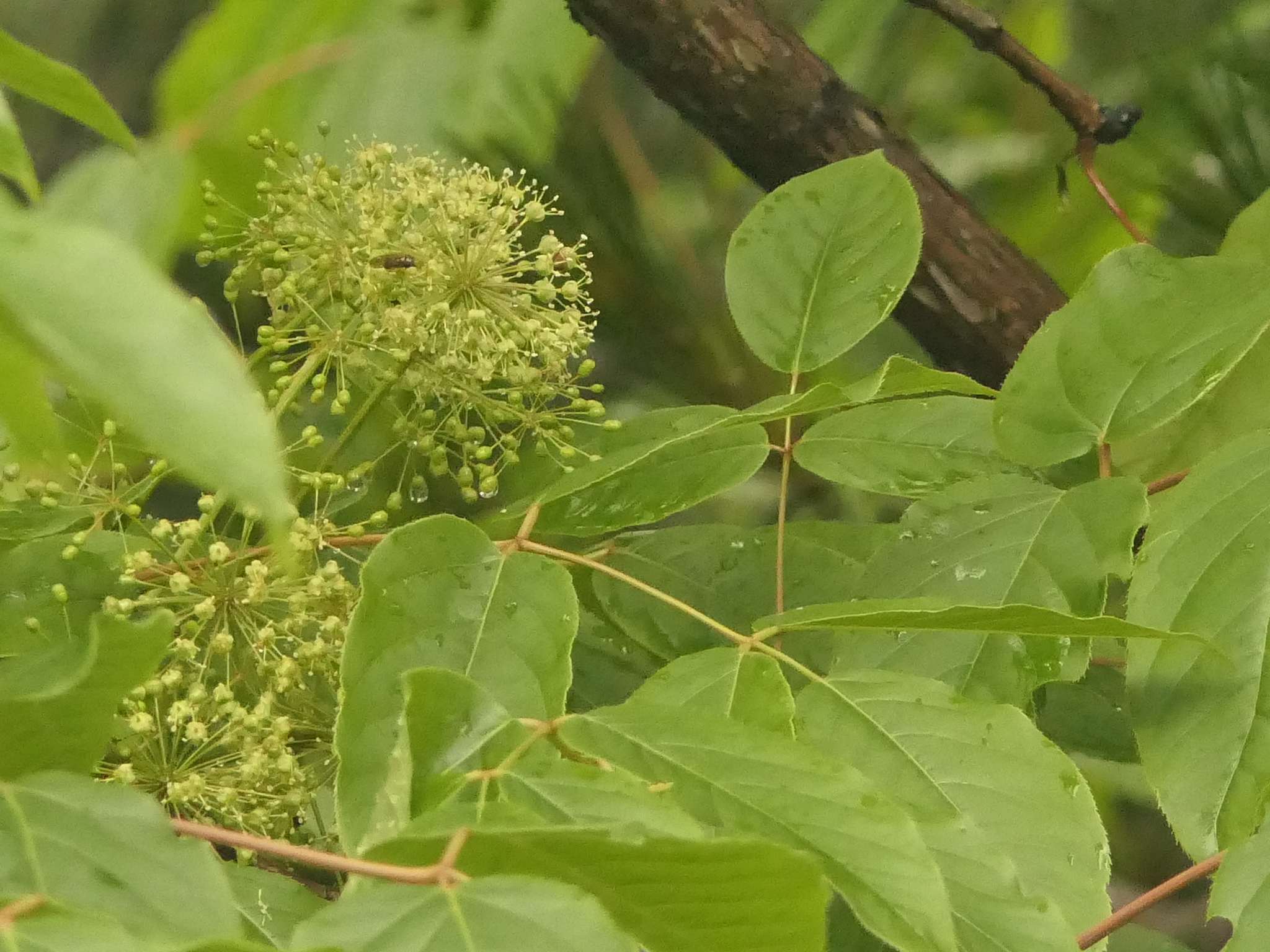
- In Nepal

Conservation status
- Least Concern (IUCN 2.3)

Scientific classification
- Kingdom: Plantae
- Clade: Embryophytes
- Clade: Tracheophytes
- Clade: Angiosperms
- Clade: Eudicots
- Clade: Asterids
- Order: Apiales
- Family: Araliaceae
- Genus: Aralia
- Species: A. leschenaultii

Binomial name
- Aralia leschenaultii (DC.) J.Wen

Synonyms
- List: Hedera fragrans D.Don; Hedera leschenaultii (DC.) Wight & Arn.; Hedera trifoliata Wight & Arn.; Panax bijugus Wall. ex G.Don; Panax leschenaultii DC.; Paratropia trifoliata (Wight & Arn.) K.Koch; Pentapanax forrestii W.W.Sm.; Pentapanax fragrans (D.Don) Ha; Pentapanax leschenaultii (DC.) Seem.; Pentapanax longipedunculatus Bui; Pentapanax truncicola Hand.-Mazz.; Pentapanax umbellatus Seem.

= Aralia leschenaultii =

Species of plant

Aralia leschenaultii, synonym Pentapanax leschenaultii, is a species of plant in the family Araliaceae. It is found in China, India, Myanmar, and Sri Lanka.
