= Aralia dasyphylla =

- In Sumatra

Conservation status
- Least Concern (IUCN 3.1)

Scientific classification
- Kingdom: Plantae
- Clade: Tracheophytes
- Clade: Angiosperms
- Clade: Eudicots
- Clade: Asterids
- Order: Apiales
- Family: Araliaceae
- Genus: Aralia
- Species: A. dasyphylla

Binomial name
- Aralia dasyphylla Miq.

Synonyms
- Aralia beccarii Ridl.; Aralia chinensis Blume; Aralia javanica Miq.

Species of flowering plant

Aralia dasyphylla is a species in the plant genus Aralia, family Araliaceae. Its native range is western Malesia (Java, Peninsular Malaysia and Sumatra). Some sources include Aralia dasyphylloides from southern China in this species.
