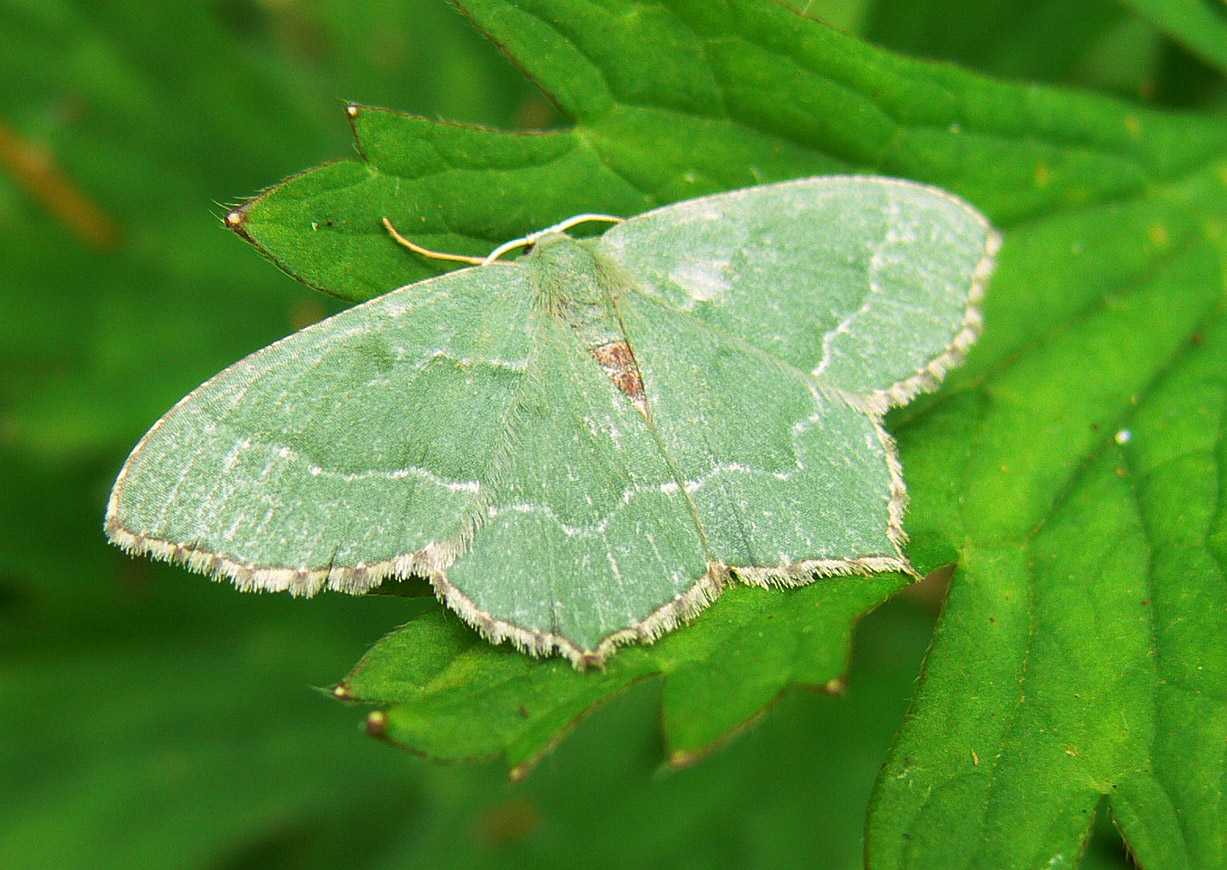
- Hemithea aestivaria

Scientific classification
- Kingdom: Animalia
- Phylum: Arthropoda
- Class: Insecta
- Order: Lepidoptera
- Family: Geometridae
- Subfamily: Geometrinae
- Tribe: Hemitheini
- Genus: Hemithea; Duponchel, 1829

Synonyms
- Chlorochroma Duponchel, 1845; Geometrina Motschulsky, [1861]; Lophocrita Warren, 1894; Mixolophia Warren, 1894

= Hemithea =

Genus of moths

Hemithea is a genus of moths in the family Geometridae erected by Philogène Auguste Joseph Duponchel in 1829. In 1999 there were about 31 species in the genus.

== Description ==
Palpi reaching just beyond the frons in male, long in female. Antennae of male usually ciliated. Hind tibia of male dilated with a fold containing a tuft of long hair. Abdomen with dorsal tufts on three segments. Forewings with vein 3 from angle of cell. Veins 7, 8, 9 and 10 stalked and vein 11 free. Hindwings with angled outer margin at vein 4. Veins 3, 4 and 6, 7 stalked.

== Species ==
- Hemithea aestivaria (Hübner, 1789) – common emerald
- Hemithea antigrapha Prout, 1917
- Hemithea aquamarina Hampson, 1895
- Hemithea insularia Guenée, 1857
- Hemithea krakenaria Holloway, 1996
- Hemithea marina (Butler, 1878)
- Hemithea melalopha Prout, 1931
- Hemithea neptunaria Holloway, 1996
- Hemithea nigriparmata Prout, 1935
- Hemithea notospila Prout, 1917
- Hemithea obscurata (Warren, 1896)
- Hemithea ochrolauta (Warren, 1894)
- Hemithea pellucidula (Turner, 1906)
- Hemithea poseidonaria Holloway, 1996
- Hemithea sequestrata (Prout 1917)
- Hemithea subaurata Warren, 1899
- Hemithea subflavida Warren, 1896
- Hemithea tritonaria (Walker, 1863)
- Hemithea undifera (Walker, 1861)
- Hemithea viridescentaria (Motschulsky, [1861])
- Hemithea wuka (Pagenstecher, 1886)
