= Aralia dasyphylloides =

Scientific classification
- Kingdom: Plantae
- Clade: Tracheophytes
- Clade: Angiosperms
- Clade: Eudicots
- Clade: Asterids
- Order: Apiales
- Family: Araliaceae
- Genus: Aralia
- Species: A. dasyphylloides

Binomial name
- Aralia dasyphylloides (Hand.-Mazz.) J.Wen

Species of plant

Aralia dasyphylloides is a species of flowering plant in the family Araliaceae, native to south China. Some sources have included it in Aralia dasyphylla.
