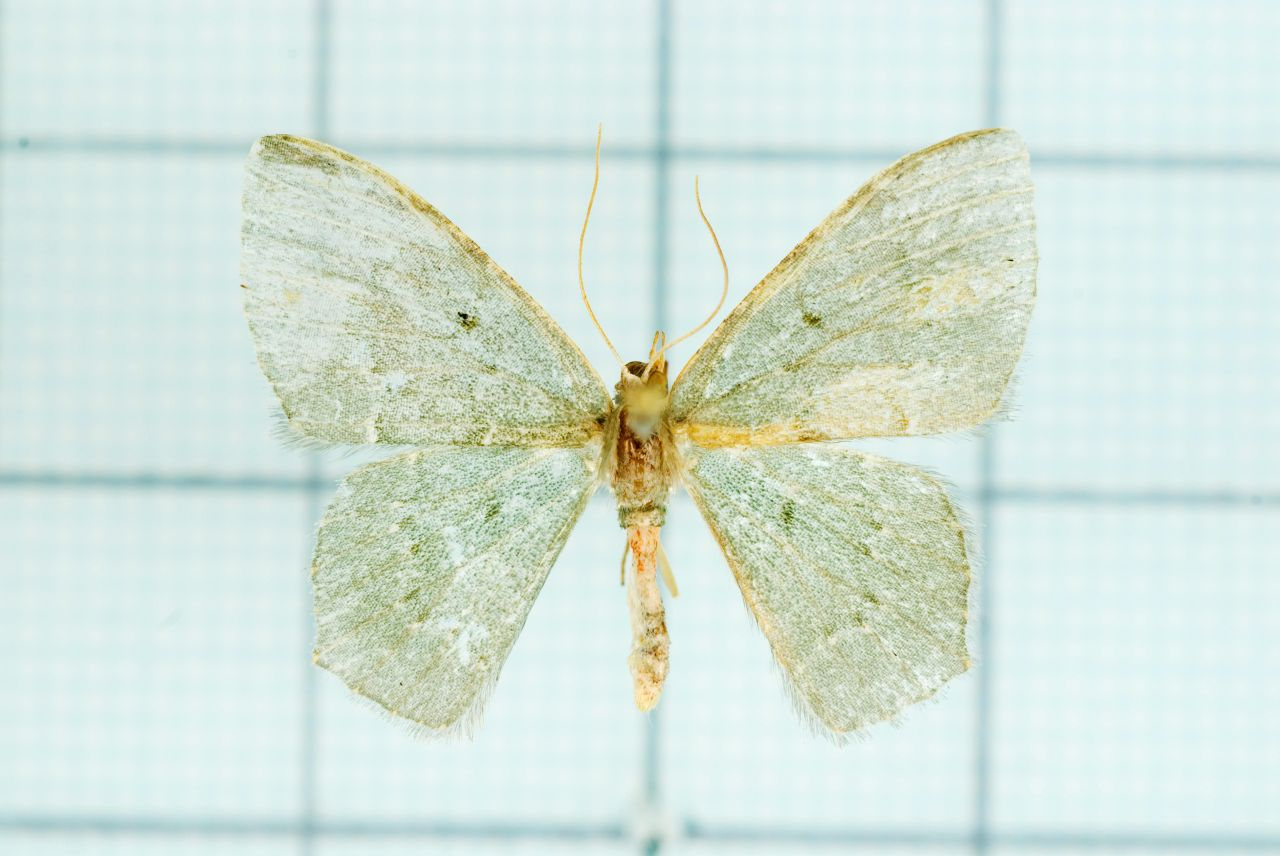

Scientific classification
- Kingdom: Animalia
- Phylum: Arthropoda
- Class: Insecta
- Order: Lepidoptera
- Family: Geometridae
- Genus: Hemithea
- Species: H. aquamarina

Binomial name
- Hemithea aquamarina Hampson, 1895

Synonyms
- Chlorissa aquamarina

= Hemithea aquamarina =

Species of moth

Hemithea aquamarina is a moth of the family Geometridae first described by George Hampson in 1895. It is found in the north-eastern parts of the Himalayas, Taiwan and Borneo.
