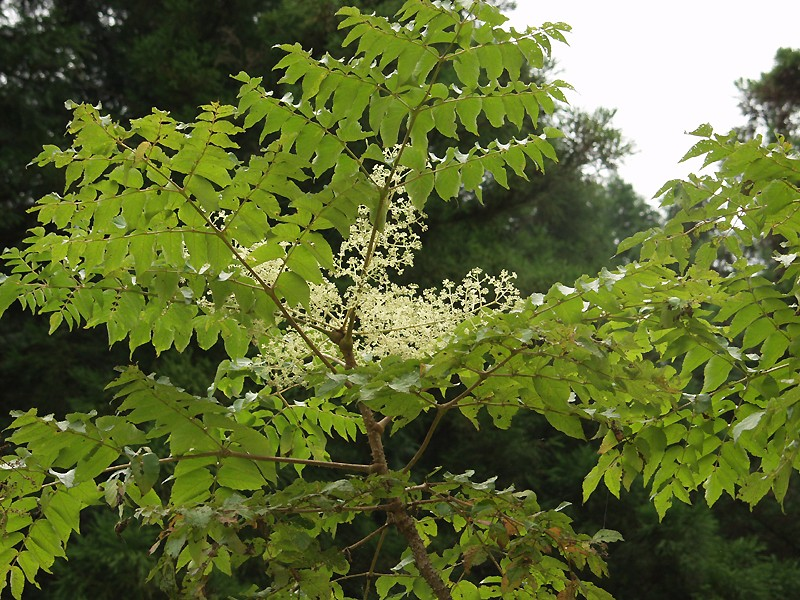

Conservation status
- Least Concern (IUCN 3.1)

Scientific classification
- Kingdom: Plantae
- Clade: Tracheophytes
- Clade: Angiosperms
- Clade: Eudicots
- Clade: Asterids
- Order: Apiales
- Family: Araliaceae
- Genus: Aralia
- Species: A. elata

Binomial name
- Aralia elata (Miq.) Seem., 1868

= Aralia elata =

Species of plant

Aralia elata, also known as the Japanese angelica tree, Chinese angelica-tree, or Korean angelica-tree, is a species of woody plant in the family Araliaceae native to eastern Asia (in Russia, China, Taiwan, the Korean Peninsula, and Japan).

== Description ==
It is an upright deciduous small tree or shrub growing up to 10 m (33 ft) in height.

The bark is rough and gray with prickles. The leaves are alternate, large, 60–120 cm long, and double pinnate. The flowers are produced in large umbels in late summer, each flower small and white. The fruit is a small black drupe.

Aralia elata is closely related to the American species Aralia spinosa, with which it is easily confused. A. elata can be differentiated by having its inflorescence on a horizontal axis.

== Cultivation ==
Aralia elata is cultivated, often in a variegated form, for its exotic appearance. It prefers deep loamy soils in partial shade, but will grow in poorer soils and in full sun. The cultivars 'Variegata' and 'Aureovariegata' have gained the Royal Horticultural Society's Award of Garden Merit.

== Culinary uses ==
=== Japan ===
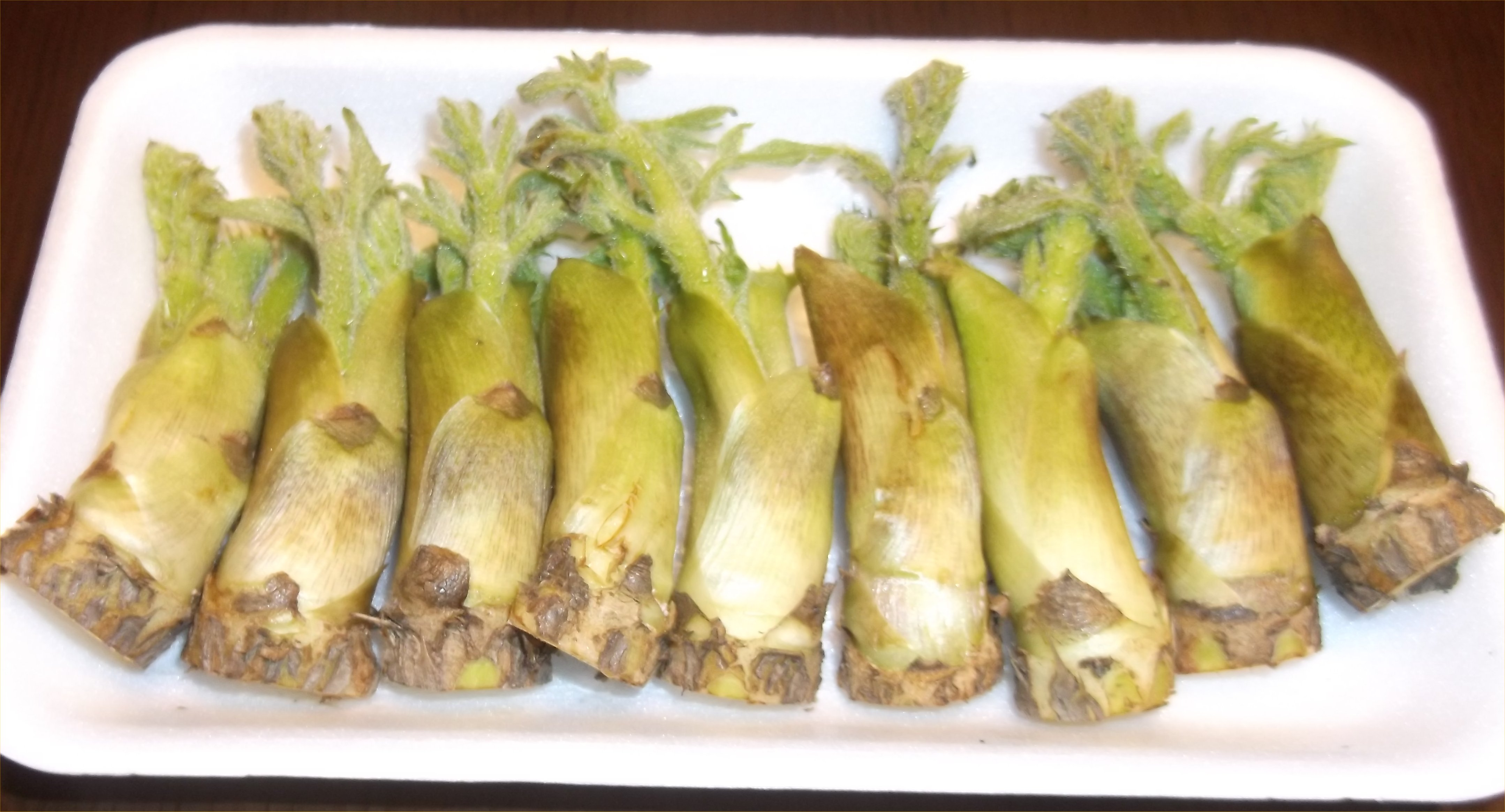

In Japan, the shoots are eaten in the spring. They are picked from the end of the branches and are commonly fried in a tempura batter. They can also be blanched or stir fried, among other methods.

=== Korea ===
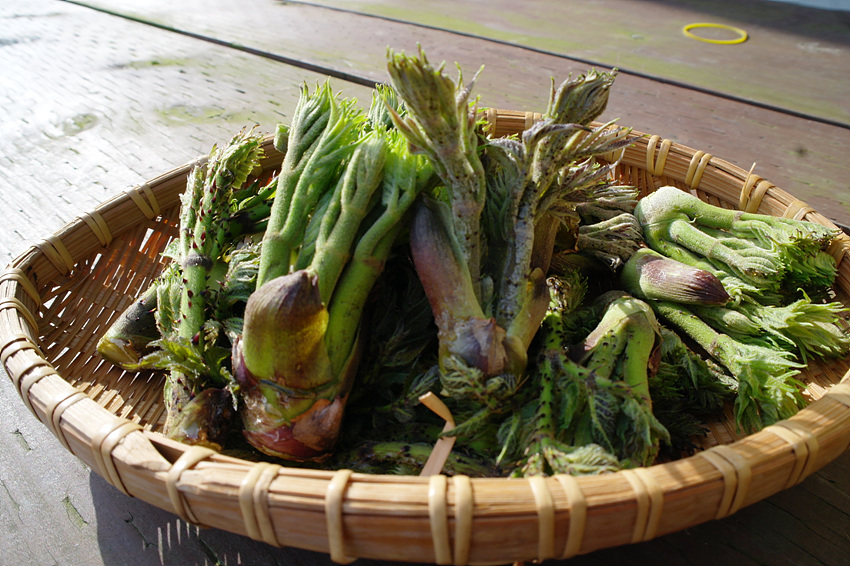

In Korea, young shoots are harvested during a month, from early April to early May, when they are soft and fragrant. In Korean cuisine, the shoots are commonly eaten blanched, pickled, pan-fried, or deep-fried.

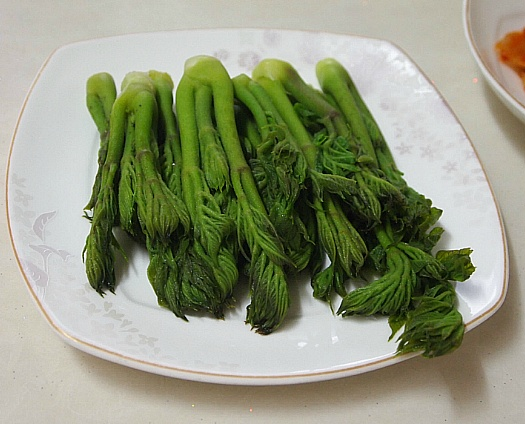
Blanched angelica-tree shoot

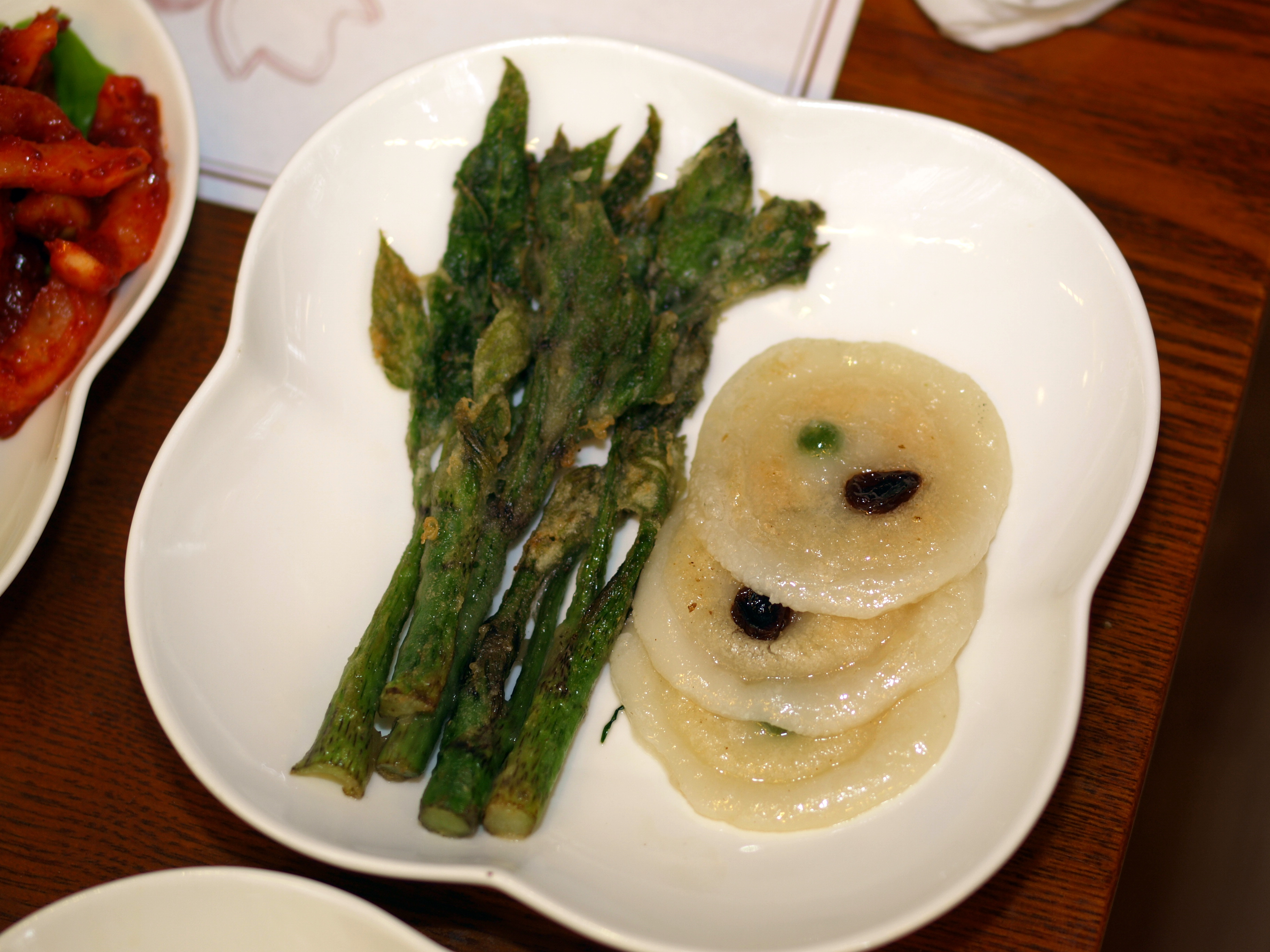
Angelica-tree shoot fritter and glutinous rice pancake

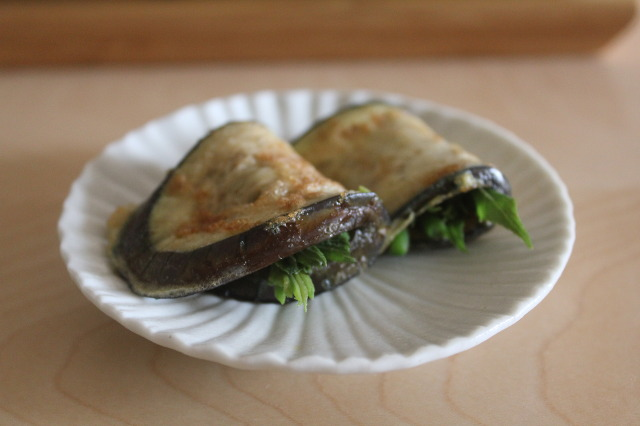
Pan-fried angelica-tree shoot and eggplant

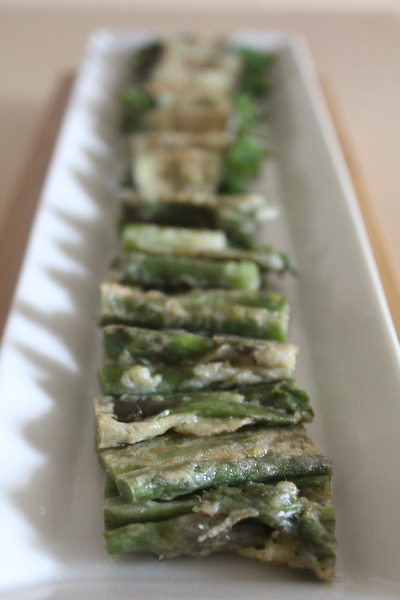
Pan-fried angelica-tree shoot

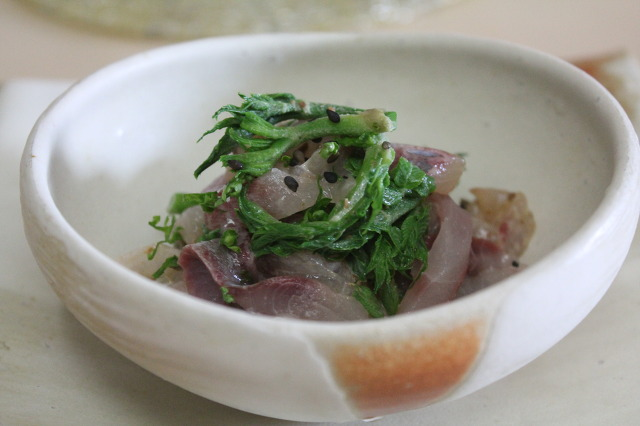
Mullet and angelica-tree shoot salad with soybean paste and mayonnaise dressing

== Invasive species ==
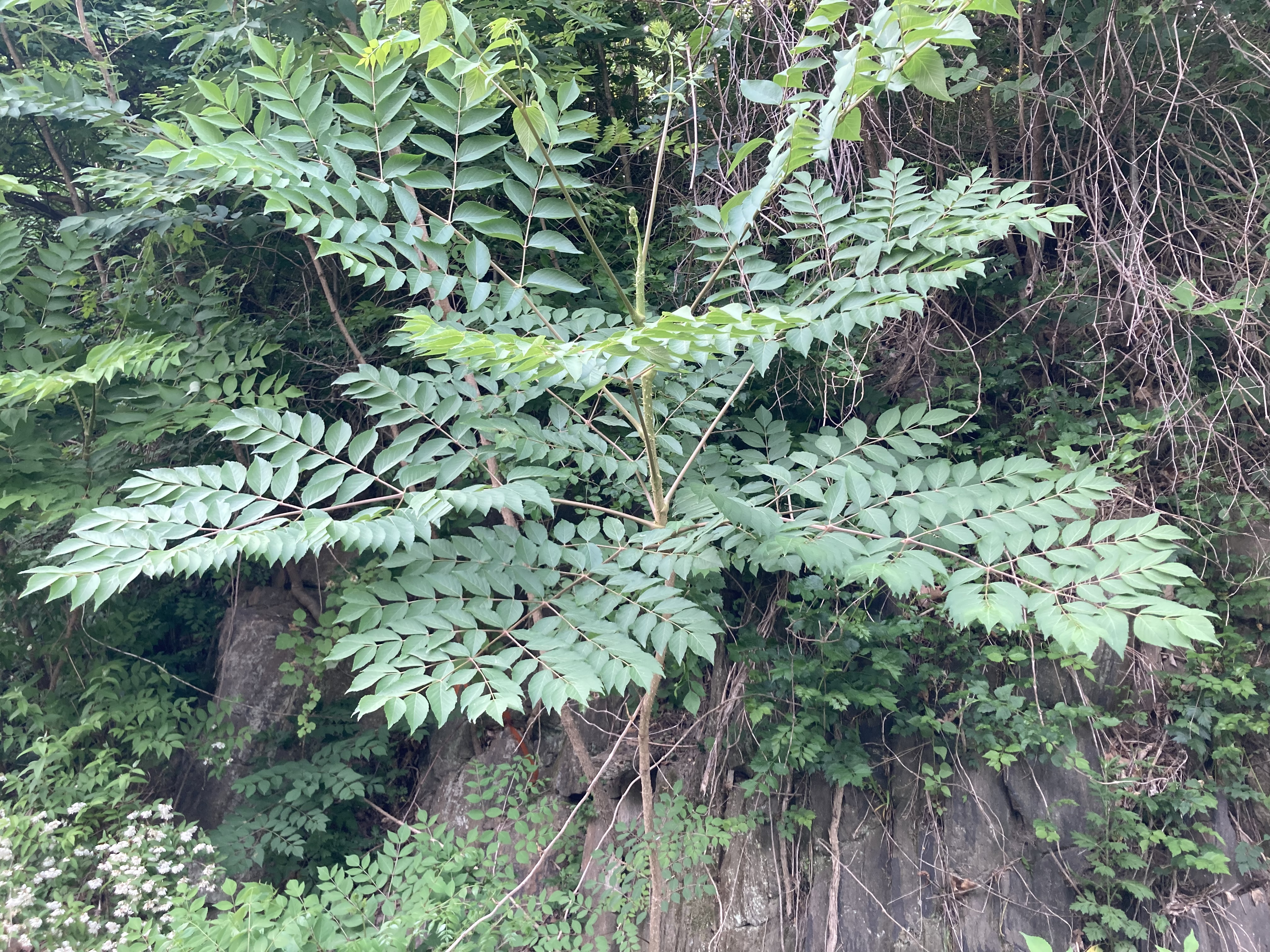
Aralia elata in the vicinity of Philadelphia, PA.

The tree was introduced into the United States in 1830. Birds like to eat the fruits, and are spreading its seeds, allowing the tree to expand its range as an invasive species in the northeastern United States.
