= Aralia elegans =

Conservation status
- Vulnerable (IUCN 3.1)

Scientific classification
- Kingdom: Plantae
- Clade: Tracheophytes
- Clade: Angiosperms
- Clade: Eudicots
- Clade: Asterids
- Order: Apiales
- Family: Araliaceae
- Genus: Aralia
- Species: A. elegans

Binomial name
- Aralia elegans C.N.Ho, 1953

Synonyms
- Aralia debilis J. Wen

Species of flowering plant

Aralia elegans is a species of plant in the family Araliaceae. It is endemic to China.
