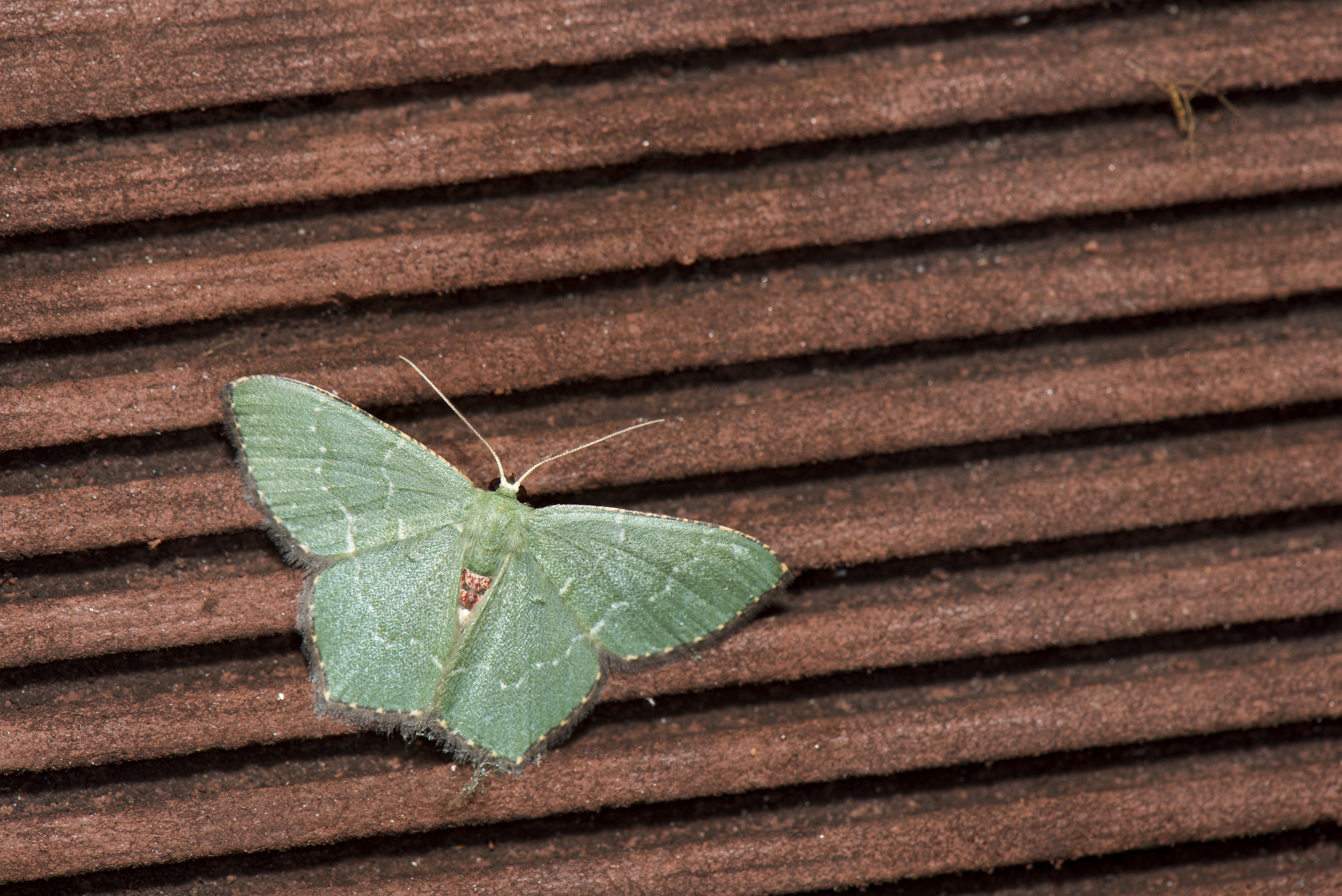

Scientific classification
- Kingdom: Animalia
- Phylum: Arthropoda
- Class: Insecta
- Order: Lepidoptera
- Family: Geometridae
- Genus: Hemithea
- Species: H. marina

Binomial name
- Hemithea marina (Butler, 1878)

Synonyms
- Thalassodes marina Butler, 1878; Thalera costipunctata Moore, 1887; Hemithea simplex Warren, 1897; Iodis pariciliata Fuchs, 1902

= Hemithea marina =

Species of moth

Hemithea marina is a moth of the family Geometridae first described by Arthur Gardiner Butler in 1878. It is found in the Indian subregion, Sri Lanka to Japan, Sundaland, Taiwan, Sulawesi and Seram.

== Description ==
It is a small moth with bluish-green wings. Punctate (dotted) white fasciae are distinct. Margin of the wings greenish. The caterpillar is brownish pink with dorsal blackish marks at the edges of the abdominal segments. Head bifid, with conical lobes. Body granular with minute white conical tubercles. There are small faint white and pink lines laterally. Pupation occurs in a cocoon made by debris.

The caterpillar is polyphagous and is known to feed on Acacia, Brassica, Citrus, Glycosmis, Hevea, Lantana camara, Mangifera indica, Memecylon and Tephrosia species.
