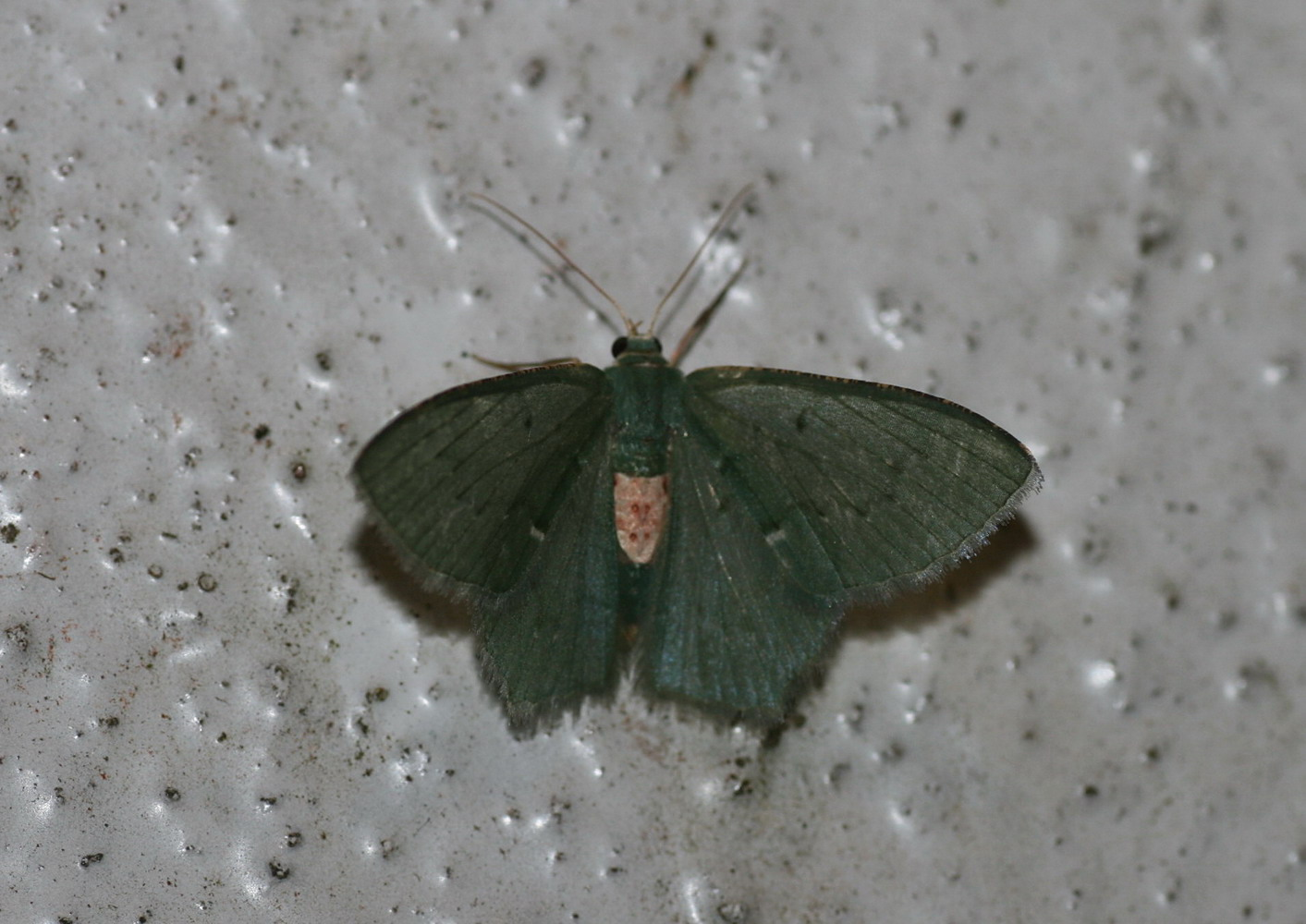

Scientific classification
- Kingdom: Animalia
- Phylum: Arthropoda
- Class: Insecta
- Order: Lepidoptera
- Family: Geometridae
- Genus: Hemithea
- Species: H. tritonaria

Binomial name
- Hemithea tritonaria (Walker, [1863])

= Hemithea tritonaria =

Species of moth

Hemithea tritonaria is a species of moth of the family Geometridae. It is found in eastern Asia, including Japan, Thailand and the Korean Peninsula.

The wingspan is 25–28 mm.
