= Aralia malabarica =

Conservation status
- Vulnerable (IUCN 2.3)

Scientific classification
- Kingdom: Plantae
- Clade: Tracheophytes
- Clade: Angiosperms
- Clade: Eudicots
- Clade: Asterids
- Order: Apiales
- Family: Araliaceae
- Genus: Aralia
- Species: A. malabarica

Binomial name
- Aralia malabarica Bedd.

Species of flowering plant

Aralia malabarica is a species of plant in the family Araliaceae. It is endemic to the Western Ghats of southern India. It grows as an understorey tree in submontane evergreen forest.
