= Aralia frodiniana =

Scientific classification
- Kingdom: Plantae
- Clade: Tracheophytes
- Clade: Angiosperms
- Clade: Eudicots
- Clade: Asterids
- Order: Apiales
- Family: Araliaceae
- Genus: Aralia
- Species: A. frodiniana

Binomial name
- Aralia frodiniana J. Wen

Species of flowering plant

Aralia frodiniana is a plant species endemic to the Island of Sulawesi in Indonesia.

It is a shrub with prickles on the stems. Leaves are bipinnate with hair and prickles on the petioles. Leaflets are ovate to elliptical, up to 8 cm long, with teeth along the margins, upper side green with a few hairs, lower side much lighter and very densely hairy. Inflorescence about 35 cm long, a collection of umbels in a paniculate array. Fruits spherical, about 4 mm in diameter, with 5 seeds each.
