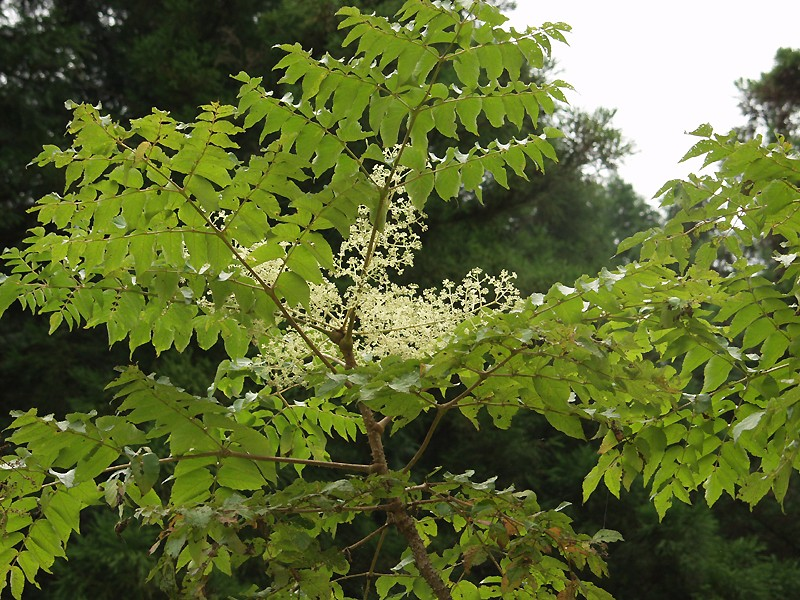
- Aralia elata

Scientific classification
- Kingdom: Plantae
- Clade: Tracheophytes
- Clade: Angiosperms
- Clade: Eudicots
- Clade: Asterids
- Order: Apiales
- Family: Araliaceae
- Subfamily: Aralioideae
- Genus: Aralia; L.

Type species
- Aralia racemosa

Synonyms
- Acanthophora Merr.; Coemansia Marchal; Coudenbergia Marchal; Cwangayana Rauschert; Dimorphanthus Miq.; Neoacanthophora Bennet; Parapentapanax Hutch.; Pentapanax Seem. (probably)

= Aralia =

Genus of flowering plants

Aralia /əˈreɪliə/, or spikenard, is a genus of the family Araliaceae, consisting of 68 accepted species of deciduous or evergreen trees, shrubs, and rhizomatous herbaceous perennials. The genus is native to Asia and the Americas, with most species occurring in mountain woodlands. Aralia plants vary in size, with some herbaceous species only reaching 50 centimetres (20 in) tall, while some are trees growing to 20 metres (66 ft) tall.

Aralia plants have large bipinnate (doubly compound) leaves clustered at the ends of their stems or branches; in some species the leaves are covered with bristles. The stems of some woody species are quite prickly, as in Aralia spinosa. The flowers are whitish or greenish occurring in terminal panicles, and the spherical dark purple berry-like fruits are popular with birds.

Aralia species are used as food plants by the larvae of some Lepidoptera species, including the common emerald (Hemithea aestivaria). There are many colours of aralia flowers. The main flower is whitish aralia.

Some species, notably Aralia cordata, are edible and are cultivated for human consumption.

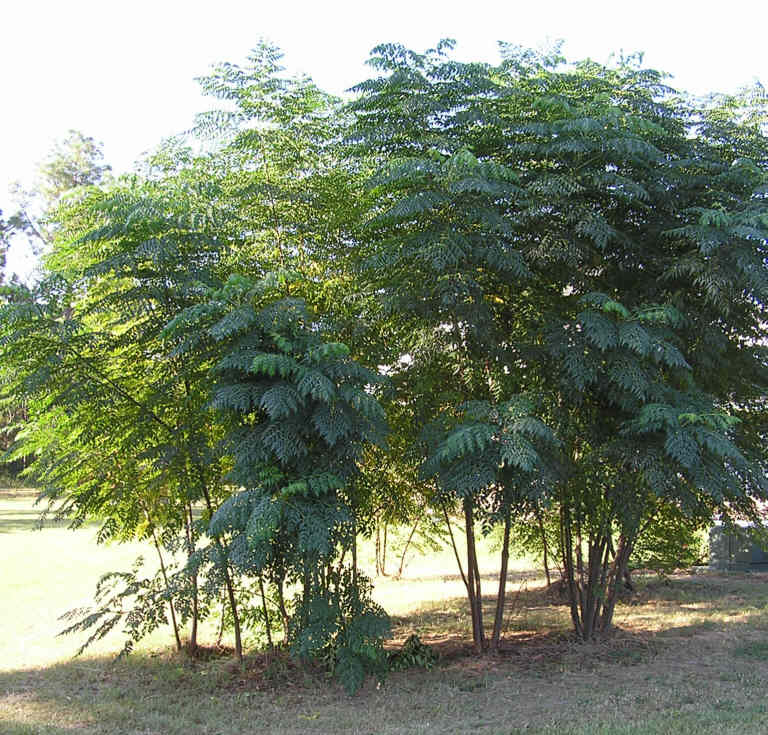
Aralia spinosa

== Taxonomy ==
The taxonomic circumscription of the genus Aralia has varied greatly. Species formerly included in wider views of the genus are now included in such separate genera as Fatsia, Macropanax, Oreopanax, Panax, Polyscias, Pseudopanax, Schefflera, and Tetrapanax.

The genus Dimorphanthus, formerly considered distinct by some, is now included within Aralia as a section within that genus.

=== Species ===
As of May 2021, Plants of the World Online accepted the following species:

- Aralia apioides Hand.-Mazz.
- Aralia armata (Wall. ex G.Don) Seem.
- Aralia atropurpurea Franch.
- Aralia bahiana J.Wen
- Aralia bicrenata Wooton & Standl.
- Aralia bipinnata Blanco
- Aralia cachemirica Decne.
- Aralia caesia Hand.-Mazz.
- Aralia californica S.Watson
- Aralia castanopsicola (Hayata) J.Wen
- Aralia chinensis L.
- Aralia continentalis Kitag.
- Aralia cordata Thunb.
- Aralia dasyphylla Miq.
- Aralia dasyphylloides (Hand.-Mazz.) J.Wen
- Aralia debilis J.Wen
- Aralia decaisneana Hance
- Aralia delavayi J.Wen
- Aralia devendrae Pusalkar
- Aralia duplex R.Chaves
- Aralia echinocaulis Hand.-Mazz.
- Aralia elata (Miq.) Seem.
- Aralia excelsa (Griseb.) J.Wen
- Aralia fargesii Franch.
- Aralia ferox Miq.
- Aralia finlaysoniana (Wall. ex G.Don) Seem.
- Aralia foliolosa Seem. ex C.B.Clarke
- Aralia frodiniana J.Wen
- Aralia gigantea J.Wen
- Aralia gintungensis C.Y.Wu ex K.M.Feng
- Aralia glabra Matsum.
- Aralia glabrifoliolata (C.B.Shang) J.Wen
- Aralia henryi Harms
- Aralia hiepiana J.Wen & Lowry
- Aralia hispida Vent.
- Aralia humilis Cav.
- Aralia hypoglauca (C.J.Qi & T.R.Cao) J.Wen & Y.F.Deng
- Aralia indonesica Doweld
- Aralia kansuensis G.Hoo
- Aralia kingdon-wardii J.Wen, Lowry & Esser
- Aralia leschenaultii (DC.) J.Wen
- Aralia malabarica Bedd.
- Aralia melanocarpa (H.Lév.) Lauener
- Aralia merrillii C.B.Shang
- Aralia mexicana (C.B.Shang & X.P.Li) Frodin
- Aralia montana Blume
- Aralia nudicaulis L.
- Aralia officinalis Z.Z.Wang
- Aralia parasitica (D.Don) Buch.-Ham. ex Otto
- Aralia plumosa H.L.Li
- Aralia racemosa L.
- Aralia regeliana Marchal
- Aralia rex (Ekman) J.Wen
- Aralia scaberula G.Hoo
- Aralia scopulorum Brandegee
- Aralia searelliana Dunn
- Aralia soratensis Marchal
- Aralia spinifolia Merr.
- Aralia spinosa L.
- Aralia stellata (King) J.Wen
- Aralia stipulata Franch.
- Aralia subcordata (Wall. ex G.Don) J.Wen
- Aralia thomsonii Seem. ex C.B.Clarke
- Aralia tibetana G.Hoo
- Aralia tomentella Franch.
- Aralia undulata Hand.-Mazz.
- Aralia urticifolia Blume ex Miq.
- Aralia verticillata (Dunn) J.Wen
- Aralia vietnamensis Ha
- Aralia wangshanensis (W.C.Cheng) Y.F.Deng
- Aralia warmingiana (Marchal) J.Wen
- Aralia wilsonii Harms
- Aralia yunnanensis Franch.

== Fossil record ==
One fossil endocarp of †Aralia pusilla has been described from a middle Miocene stratum of the Fasterholt area near Silkeborg in Central Jutland, Denmark. Several fossil fruits of Aralia rugosa and †Aralia tertiaria have been extracted from bore hole samples of the Middle Miocene fresh water deposits in Nowy Sacz Basin, West Carpathians, Poland. Several Aralia macrofossils have been recovered from the late Zanclean stage of Pliocene sites in Pocapaglia, Italy.
