= Aralia decaisneana =

- Foliage

Scientific classification
- Kingdom: Plantae
- Clade: Tracheophytes
- Clade: Angiosperms
- Clade: Eudicots
- Clade: Asterids
- Order: Apiales
- Family: Araliaceae
- Genus: Aralia
- Species: A. decaisneana

Binomial name
- Aralia decaisneana Hance

Species of plant

Aralia decaisneana, called Decaisne's spikenard, is a species of flowering plant in the family Araliaceae. It is native to Taiwan. A deciduous shrub 2.5 to 4 m (8 to 13 ft) tall and wide, it is typically found in open woodlands and scrublands, growing on slopes below 1,300 m (4,300 ft). It is occasionally available from commercial suppliers.
