= Aralia castanopsicola =

Conservation status
- Vulnerable (IUCN 3.1)

Scientific classification
- Kingdom: Plantae
- Clade: Tracheophytes
- Clade: Angiosperms
- Clade: Eudicots
- Clade: Asterids
- Order: Apiales
- Family: Araliaceae
- Genus: Aralia
- Species: A. castanopsicola

Binomial name
- Aralia castanopsicola (Hayata) J.Wen

Synonyms
- Aralia castanopsisicola Hayata, orth. var.; Aralia castanopsidicola Hayata, orth. var.; Pentapanax castanopsicola Hayata

Species of plant

Aralia castanopsicola, synonym Pentapanax castanopsicola, is a species of plant in the family Araliaceae. It is endemic to Taiwan. It is threatened by habitat loss. The specific epithet is spelt in various ways, including castanopsidicola.

== Taxonomy ==
The species was first described by Bunzō Hayata in 1915 in the genus Pentapanax. The epithet has been spelt in various ways. Hayata spelt it castanopsisicola, writing that it grew on the trunks of Castanopsis. The element -cola means 'dweller', so the epithet can be analysed as castanopsis-i-cola. Article 60.10 of the International Code of Nomenclature for algae, fungi, and plants requires such a construction to use the stem of the genitive of first element rather than the whole word before adding -icola. Accordingly, the International Plant Names Index and Plants of the World Online have corrected Hayata's spelling to castanopsicola, which uses the construction castanops-i-cola. In botanical tradition, the genitive ending of words ending -opsis has often been -opsidis (rather than the classically correct -opseos), so an alternative correction to Hayata's spelling is castanopsidicola, as used in the Flora of China for example.

In 1993, Jun Wen transferred Pentapanax castanopsicola to Aralia on the basis of molecular phylogenetic evidence. Multiple studies since have confirmed that Pentapanax is nested within Aralia.
