= Aralia hypoglauca =

Scientific classification
- Kingdom: Plantae
- Clade: Tracheophytes
- Clade: Angiosperms
- Clade: Eudicots
- Clade: Asterids
- Order: Apiales
- Family: Araliaceae
- Genus: Aralia
- Species: A. hypoglauca

Binomial name
- Aralia hypoglauca (C.J.Qi & T.R.Cao) J.Wen & Y.F.Deng

Synonyms
- Hunaniopanax hypoglaucus C.J.Qi & T.R.Cao; Pentapanax hypoglaucus (C.J.Qi & T.R.Cao) C.B.Shang & X.P.Li

Species of flowering plant

Aralia hypoglauca is a species of flowering plant in the family Araliaceae. It is an epiphytic shrub native to Guangxi and southwestern Hunan provinces of China. It has been treated as the only species Hunaniopanax hypoglaucus of the genus Hunanioglaucus.
