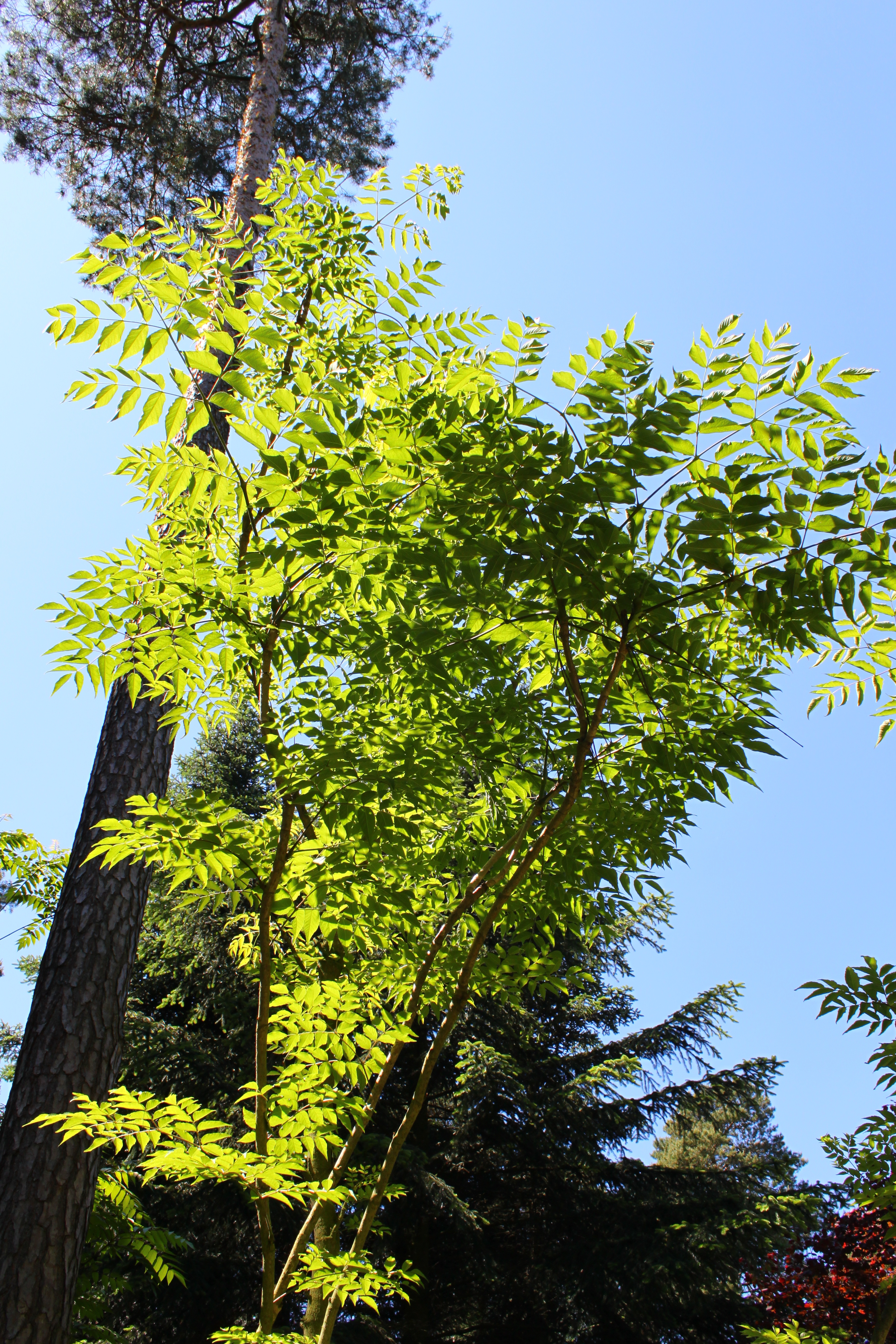

Conservation status
- Vulnerable (IUCN 3.1)

Scientific classification
- Kingdom: Plantae
- Clade: Tracheophytes
- Clade: Angiosperms
- Clade: Eudicots
- Clade: Asterids
- Order: Apiales
- Family: Araliaceae
- Genus: Aralia
- Species: A. chinensis

Binomial name
- Aralia chinensis L.

= Aralia chinensis =

Species of tree

Aralia chinensis (known as Chinese angelica-tree, syn. Aralia sinensis hort.) is a species of the family Araliaceae native to China, Vietnam, and Borneo.
