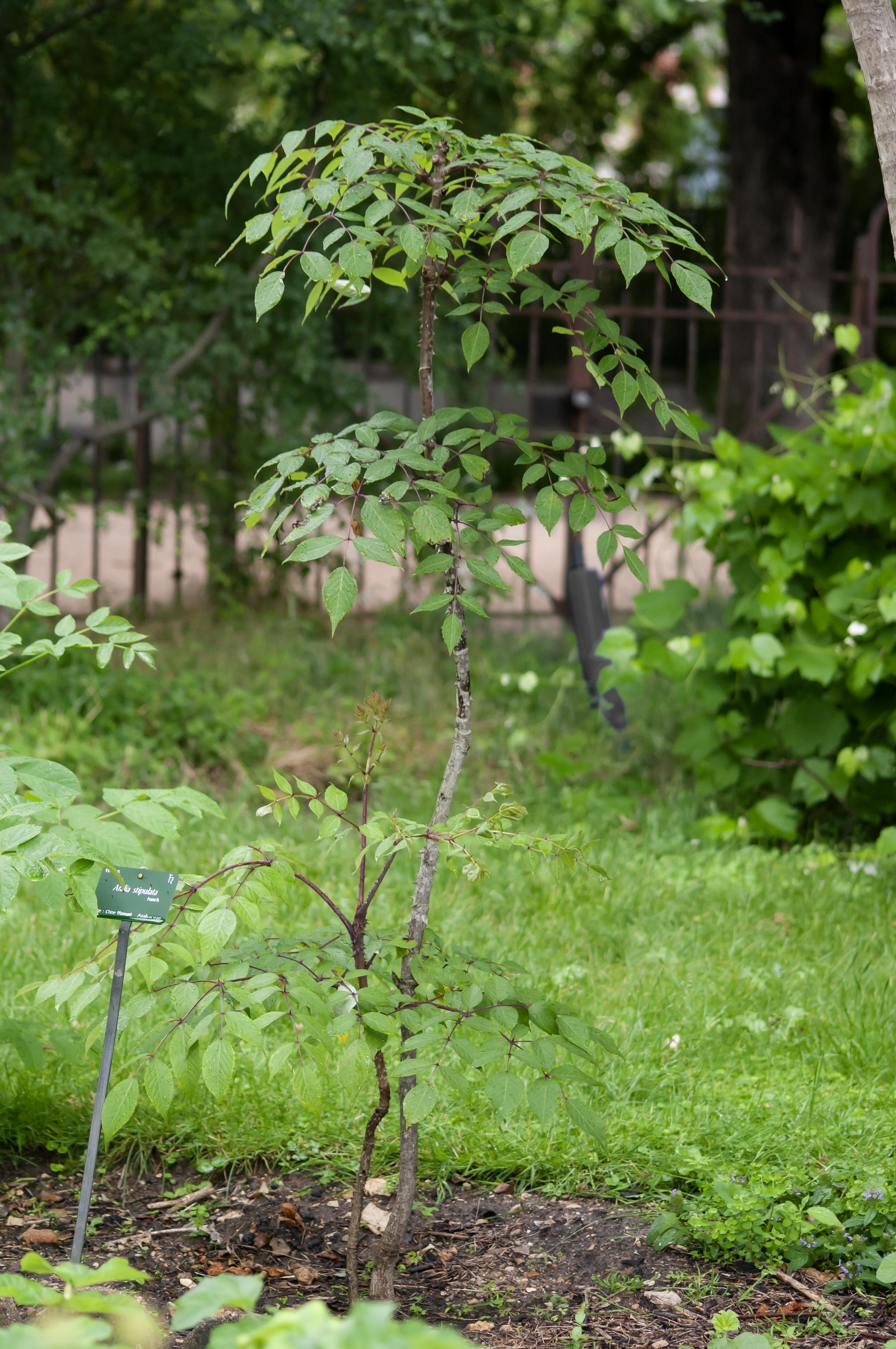
- Aralia stipulata, botanical garden in Paris

Scientific classification
- Kingdom: Plantae
- Clade: Tracheophytes
- Clade: Angiosperms
- Clade: Eudicots
- Clade: Asterids
- Order: Apiales
- Family: Araliaceae
- Genus: Aralia
- Species: A. stipulata

Binomial name
- Aralia stipulata Franch.

= Aralia stipulata =

Species of plant

Aralia stipulata is a plant species native to China.
