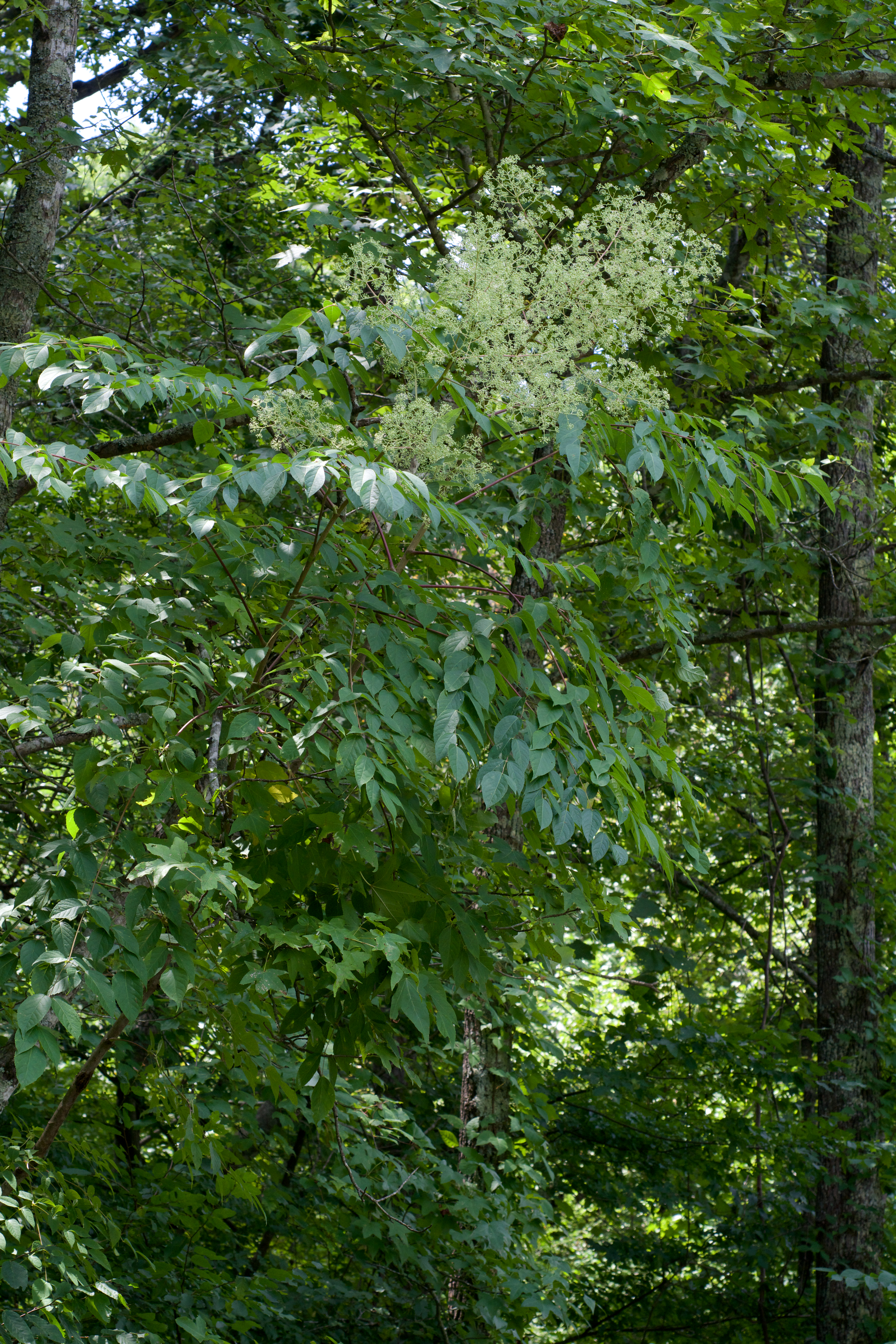

Conservation status
- Least Concern (IUCN 3.1)

- Secure (NatureServe)

Scientific classification
- Kingdom: Plantae
- Clade: Tracheophytes
- Clade: Angiosperms
- Clade: Eudicots
- Clade: Asterids
- Order: Apiales
- Family: Araliaceae
- Genus: Aralia
- Species: A. spinosa

Binomial name
- Aralia spinosa L.
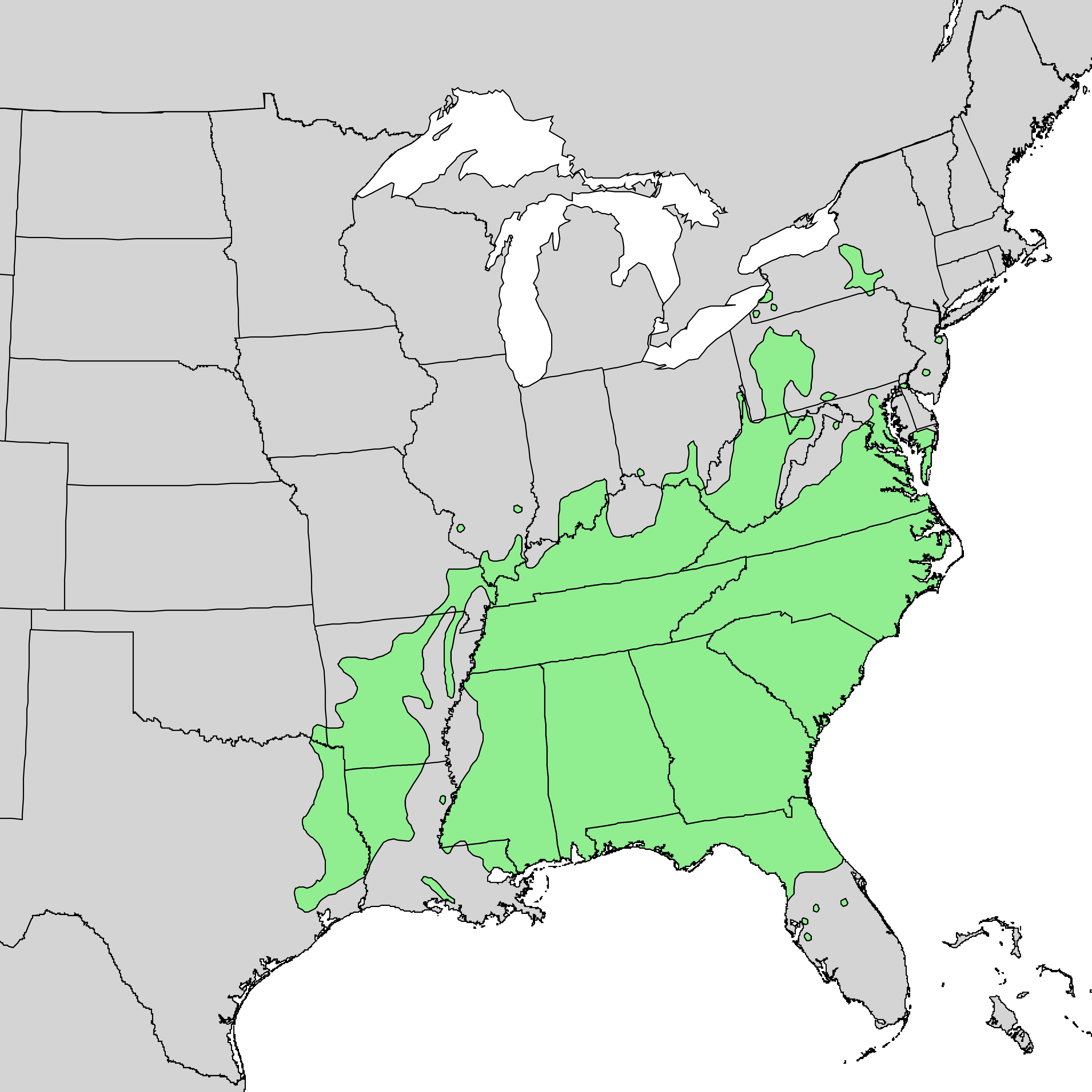
- Natural range of Aralia spinosa

= Aralia spinosa =

Species of tree

Aralia spinosa, commonly known as devil's walking stick, is a woody species of plant in the genus Aralia of the family Araliaceae. It is native to eastern North America. The various names refer to the viciously sharp, spiny stems, petioles and even leaf midribs. It has also been known as Angelica-tree.

This species is sometimes called Hercules' club, prickly ash or prickly elder. These are common names it shares with the unrelated Zanthoxylum clava-herculis. For this reason, Aralia spinosa is sometimes confused with that species and mistakenly called the toothache tree. It does not have the medicinal properties of Zanthoxylum clava-herculis.

Aralia spinosa is occasionally cultivated for its exotic or tropical appearance because of its large lacy compound leaves. It is closely related to the Asian species Aralia elata, a more commonly cultivated species with which it is easily confused.

== Description ==
Aralia spinosa is an aromatic, spiny deciduous shrub or small tree growing 2–8 m (7–26 ft) tall. It has a simple or, occasionally, branched stem with very large bipinnate leaves 70–120 cm (30–45 in) long. The trunks are up to 15–20 cm (6–8 in) in diameter, with the plants umbrella-like canopy in habit with open crowns. The young stems are stout and thickly covered with sharp spines. The plants generally grow in clusters of branchless trunks, although stout wide-spreading branches are occasionally produced.

The flowers are creamy-white. Each individual flower is small (about 5 mm or 3/16 in across) but produced in a large composite panicles which is 30–60 cm (12–24 in) long. Flowering is in late summer. The fruit is a purplish-black berry that is 6–8 mm (1/4–5/16 in) in diameter and ripens during fall. The roots are thick and fleshy.

The double or triple compound leaves are the largest of any temperate tree in the continental United States. Each may be about one metre (3.3 ft) long and 76 centimetres (2.5 ft) wide with leaflets that are 5–8 cm (2–3 in) long. The petioles are prickly with swollen bases. In the autumn the leaves turn to a peculiar bronze red (touched with yellow) that makes the tree conspicuous and attractive.

The habit of growth and general appearance of Aralia spinosa and related tree-forming Aralia species are unique. It is usually found as a group of unbranched stems, rising to the height of 3.5–6 m (11–20 ft). They bear a crowded cluster of double or triple compound leaves in their canopies, thus giving each stem a certain tropical palm-like appearance. In the south, they are said to reach the height of 15 m (50 ft), still retaining its palm-like looks. Further north, however, the slender, swaying palm-like appearance is most characteristic of younger plants that have not been damaged by winter storms.

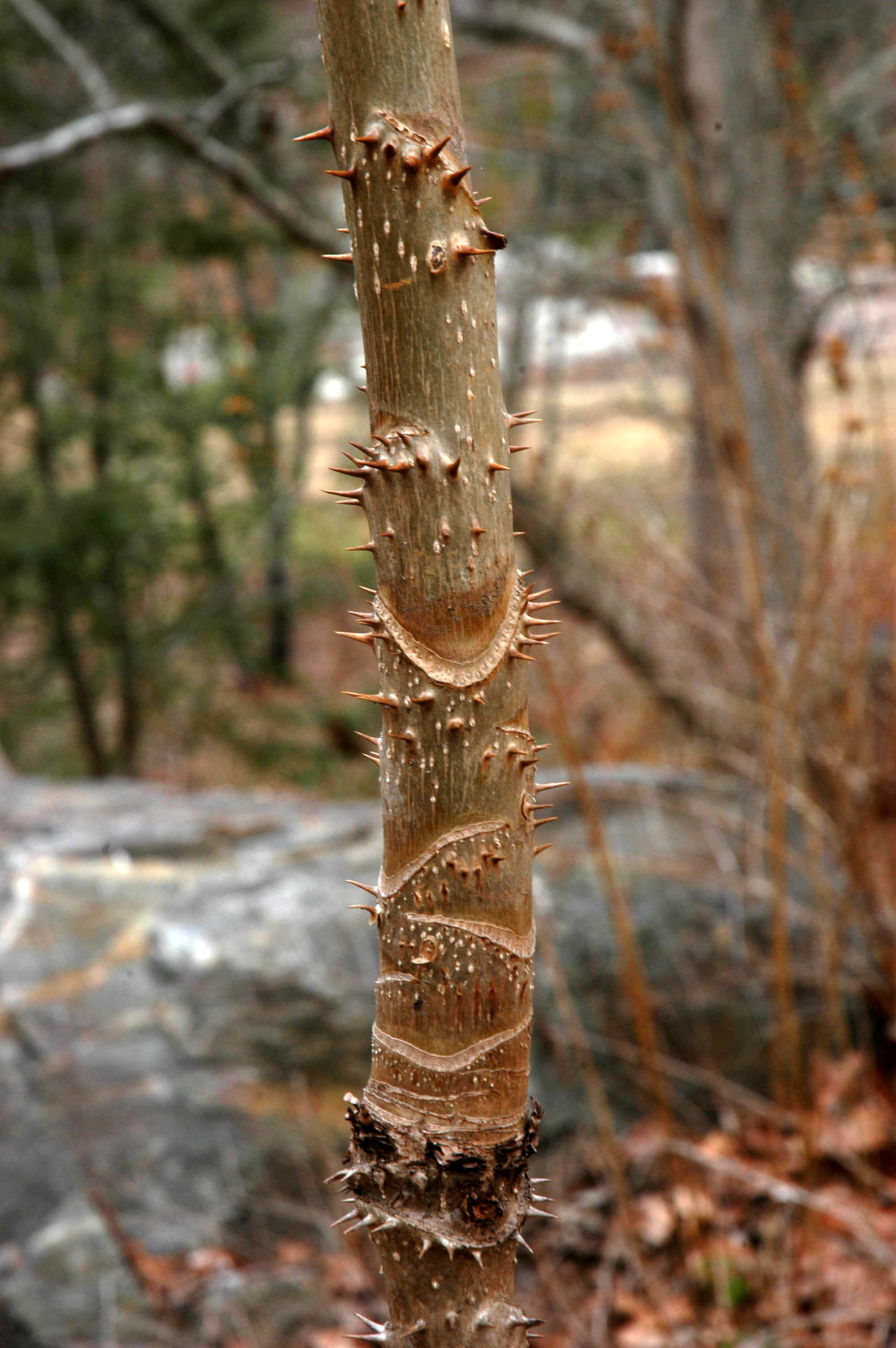
The trunk, showing the bark, leaf scars, and spines.

- Bark: Light brown, divided into rounded, broken ridges. Branchlets are one-half to two-thirds of an inch in diameter. The branchlets are armed with stout, straight or curved, scattered prickles and almost completely encircled by narrow leaf scars. At first light yellow brown, shining and dotted. Later, light brown.
- Wood: Brown with yellow streaks. Light, soft, brittle and close-grained.
- Winter buds: Terminal bud is chestnut brown, one-half to three-fourths of an inch long, conical and blunt. Axillary buds are flattened, triangular and one-fourth of an inch in length.
- Leaves: Clustered at the end of the branches, compound, bi- and tri-pinnate, three to four feet long and two and a half feet broad. The pinnae are unequally pinnate, having five or six pairs of leaflets and a long-stalked terminal leaflet. These leaflets are often themselves pinnate. The last leaflets are ovate, two to three inches long, wedge-shaped or rounded at base, serrate or dentate and acute. Midrib and primary veins are prominent. The leaves come out of the bud a bronze green, shining and somewhat hairy. When full grown, the leaves are dark green above and pale beneath. Midribs are frequently furnished with prickles. Petioles are stout, light brown and eighteen to twenty inches in length, clasping and armed with prickles. Stipules are acute and one-half inch long.
- Flowers: July, August. Perfect or polygamomonoecious, cream white, borne in many-flowered umbels that are arranged in compound panicles. They form a terminal racemose cluster, three to four feet in length. They rise solitary, or two to three together, above the spreading leaves. Bracts and bractlets are lanceolate, acute and persistent.
- Calyx: Calyx tube, coherent with the ovary, is minutely five-toothed.
- Corolla: Five petals, white, inserted on margin of the disk, acute, slightly inflexed at the apex and imbricate in bud.
- Stamens: Five, inserted on margin of the disk and alternate with the petals. Filaments are thread-like. anthers are oblong, attached to the back, introrse and two-celled. Cells open longitudinally.
- Pistil: Inferior ovary, five-celled and connivent. Capitate stigma.
- Fruit: Berry-like drupe, globular, black, one-fourth of an inch long, five-angled and crowned with blackened styles. Flesh is thin and dark.

== Distribution and habitat ==
Aralia spinosa is widespread in the eastern United States. It ranges from New York to Florida along the Atlantic coast and westward to Ohio, Illinois, and Texas. It prefers a deep moist soil. The plants typically grow in the forest understory or at the edges of forests. They often form clonal thickets by sprouting from the roots.

This tree was admired by the Iroquois because of its usefulness and for its rarity. The Iroquois would take the saplings of the tree and plant them near their villages and on islands so that animals wouldn't eat the valuable fruit. The fruit was used in many of the natives' foods. The women would take the flowers and put them in their hair because of the lemony smell. The flowers could also be traded for money.

In the past, botanists attributed occurrences of Aralia north of Maryland and Delaware in the Mid-Atlantic states to the introduction of Aralia spinosa from areas to the south. However, some of these occurrences are now known to be of Aralia elata (Japanese Angelica-tree), a related Asian species that is invasive to the area. A. spinosa and A. elata are difficult to distinguish in the field and leads to confusion. In at least one area of Philadelphia, A. elata is displacing A. spinosa with unknown impacts on the local ecology.

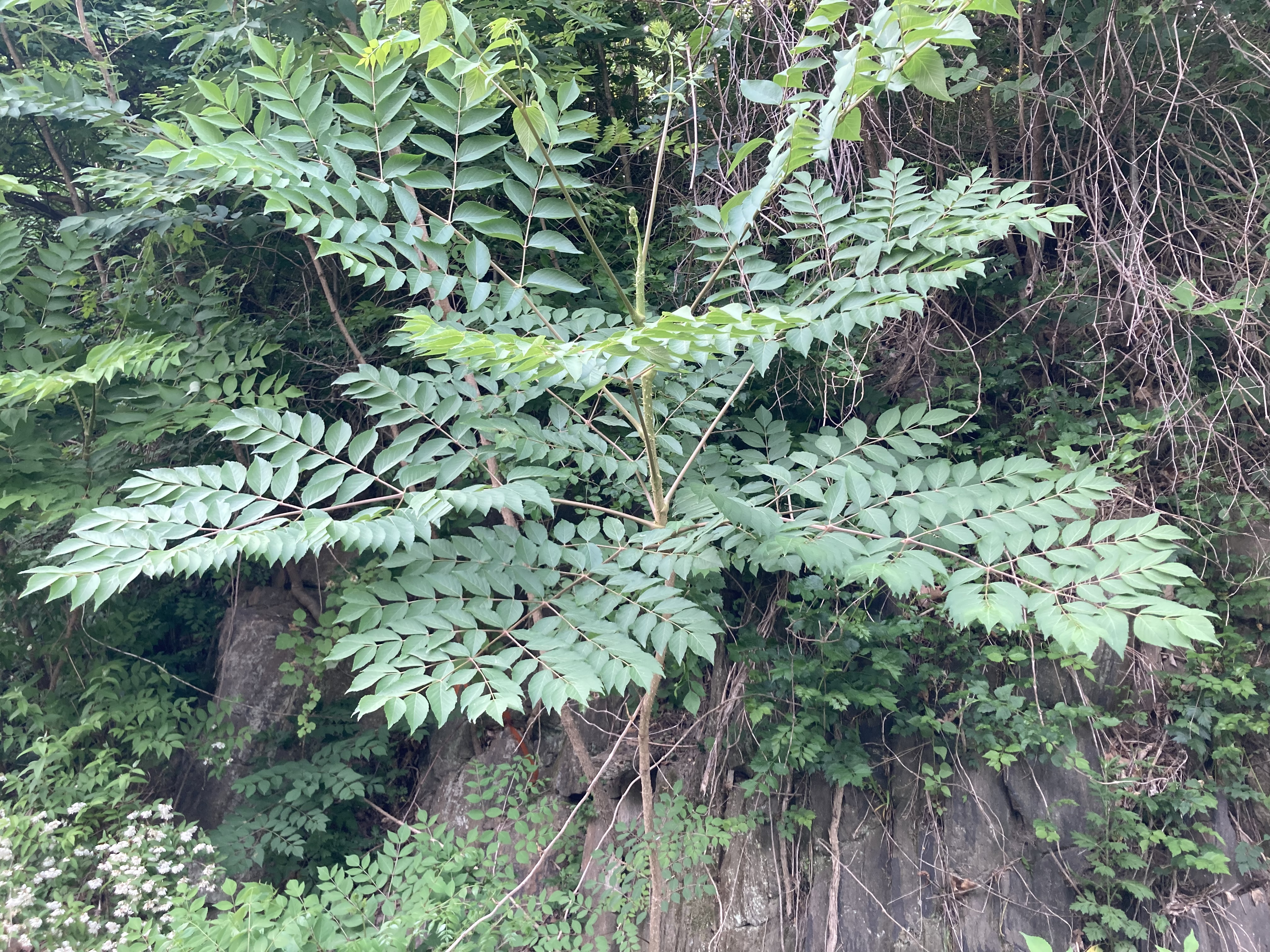
Aralia elata in the vicinity of Philadelphia, PA.

== Uses ==
The young leaves can be eaten if gathered before the prickles harden. They are then chopped finely and cooked as a pot herb.

Aralia spinosa was introduced into cultivation in 1688 and is still grown for its decorative foliage, prickly stems, large showy flower panicles (clusters) and distinctive fall color. These plants are slow growing, tough and durable, do well in urban settings, but bear numerous prickles on their stems, petioles, and leaflets. These plants can be propagated from seeds or root cuttings.

Early American settlers used the plant for its alleged properties for curing toothaches. The plant was used as a medicine during the American Civil War. In a laboratory study, extracts from the plant showed antimicrobial activity against multidrug-resistant bacteria associated with wound infections.
