= Aralia hispida =

Scientific classification
- Kingdom: Plantae
- Clade: Tracheophytes
- Clade: Angiosperms
- Clade: Eudicots
- Clade: Asterids
- Order: Apiales
- Family: Araliaceae
- Genus: Aralia
- Species: A. hispida

Binomial name
- Aralia hispida Vent.

Species of flowering plant

Aralia hispida, commonly known as the bristly sarsaparilla, is a member of the family Araliaceae. It can be found in eastern North America from Hudson Bay south to Indiana and from Minnesota east to Newfoundland. It prefers dry and sandy soil, and is a perennial that blooms in June and July. It has a rhizome that can overwinter up to 50 centimetres (20 in) above ground. It has ovate to bipinnately compound leaves with 10 centimetres (3.9 in), serrate, ovate to shield-shaped leaflets on short petioles. Fruits are dark and globose.
