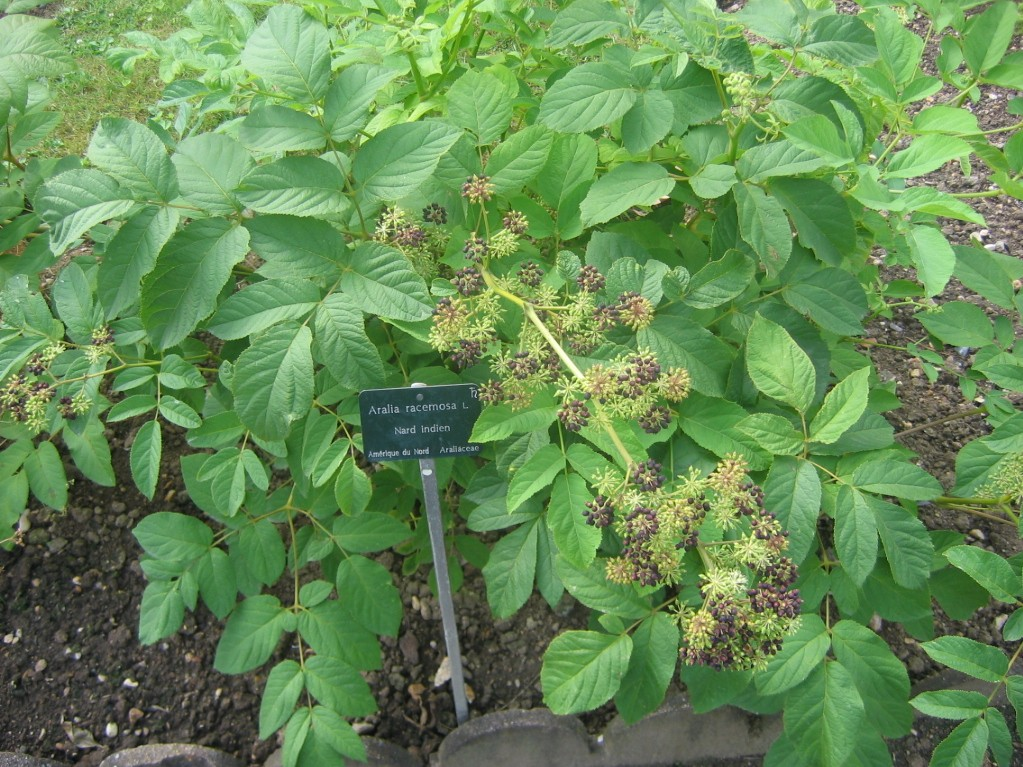

Scientific classification
- Kingdom: Plantae
- Clade: Tracheophytes
- Clade: Angiosperms
- Clade: Eudicots
- Clade: Asterids
- Order: Apiales
- Family: Araliaceae
- Genus: Aralia
- Species: A. racemosa

Binomial name
- Aralia racemosa L.

= Aralia racemosa =

Species of flowering plant

Aralia racemosa, with common names American spikenard, small spikenard, Indian root, spice berry, spignet, life-of-man, petty morel, is an ornamental plant in the family Araliaceae native to the United States and Canada. It is a herbaceous plant, about 1 to 2 m (3 ft 3 in to 6 ft 7 in) tall, which grows in shady areas. Its native range includes most of the eastern United States.
