= P. linearis =

P. linearis may refer to:

- Palafoxia linearis, a plant species in the genus Palafoxia
- Persoonia linearis, a shrub species in the genus Persoonia
- Petalonyx linearis, the narrowleaf sandpaper plant, a flowering plant species native to the deserts of eastern California, western Arizona and northwestern Mexico
- Petrophile linearis, the Pixie mops, a shrub species endemic to Western Australia
- Phacelia linearis, the linear-leaf scorpion-weed, a plant species in the genus Phacelia native to Canada
- Philotheca linearis (A.Cunn. ex Endl.) Paul G.Wilson, a plant species in the genus Philotheca
- Phlegethontia linearis, an extinct amphibian species from the Carboniferous and Permian periods of Europe and North America
- Prasiola linearis, an algae species in the genus Prasiola
- Pseudopanax linearis, a plant species in the genus Pseudopanax
- Pleurothallis linearis, a plant species in the genus Pleurothallis native to Mexico
- Pteris linearis, Poir., a fern species in the genus Pteris

== Synonyms ==
- Phlomis linearis, a synonym for Phlomis armeniaca, a plant species
- Puccinia linearis, a synonym for Puccinia graminis, the stem rust, a cereal fungal disease

== See also ==
- Linearis
