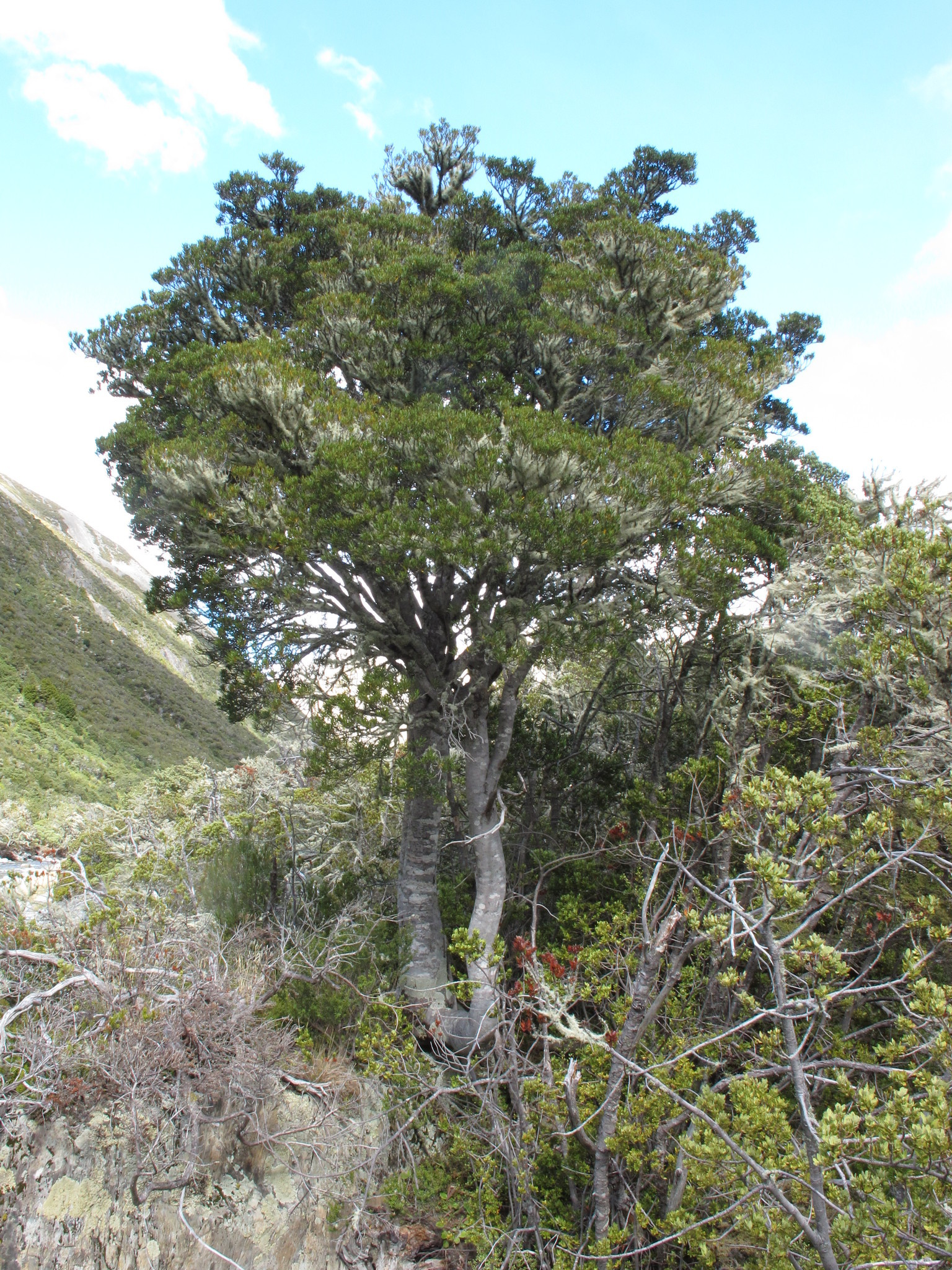
- P. patulum near Lake Ōhau

Conservation status
- Endangered (IUCN 2.3)

- Nationally Endangered (NZ TCS)

Scientific classification
- Kingdom: Plantae
- Clade: Tracheophytes
- Clade: Angiosperms
- Clade: Eudicots
- Clade: Asterids
- Order: Apiales
- Family: Pittosporaceae
- Genus: Pittosporum
- Species: P. patulum

Binomial name
- Pittosporum patulum Hook.f.

= Pittosporum patulum =

Species of flowering plant

Pittosporum patulum, commonly known as pit-pat, is a plant species endemic to the South Island of New Zealand where it has a restricted distribution ranging from Nelson in the north with occurrences in inland Marlborough down to Wānaka in the south. It is unusual amongst the genus in having deep red and scented flowers.

== Description ==
Pittosporum patulum is a small gynodioecious tree in the family Pittosporaceae, that usually reaches 5 metres (16.4 feet) in height. Similar to the common lancewood and toothed lancewood , P. patulum is also a heteroblastic plant, meaning it has distinct juvenile and adult forms.

Juvenile plants have a cryptic coloured single stem growth form with narrow serrated leaves. Adult P. patulum can reach a height of up to 5 metres (16.4 feet). they eventually develop a form with many spreading branches at their tops, resembling a more round-headed tree.

=== Leaves ===
Juvenile leaves are usually chocolate-brown to dark-green that are toothed along the margins. These linear formed leaves usually measure 30–60 (1.18– 2.36 in) × 5–8 mm (0.2–0.31 in).

The leaves on adult plants are more leathery and broader than juveniles, and measure 40–50 (1.57–1.97 in) × 10–20 mm (0.4–0.79 in). The margins of adult leaves also become less serrated.

=== Trunk ===
The trunk of P. patulum starts slender in juveniles, becoming stouter in mature adult trees. It also develops pale brown to grey-brown, firm bark, often with leaf scars on branchlets.

=== Flowers ===
The small 6–8 mm (0.23–0.31 in) dark-red to pink, occasionally yellow flowers are clustered in distinct terminal umbels. The umbels usually consist of between 4 and 10 flowers per cluster.

== Habitat ==
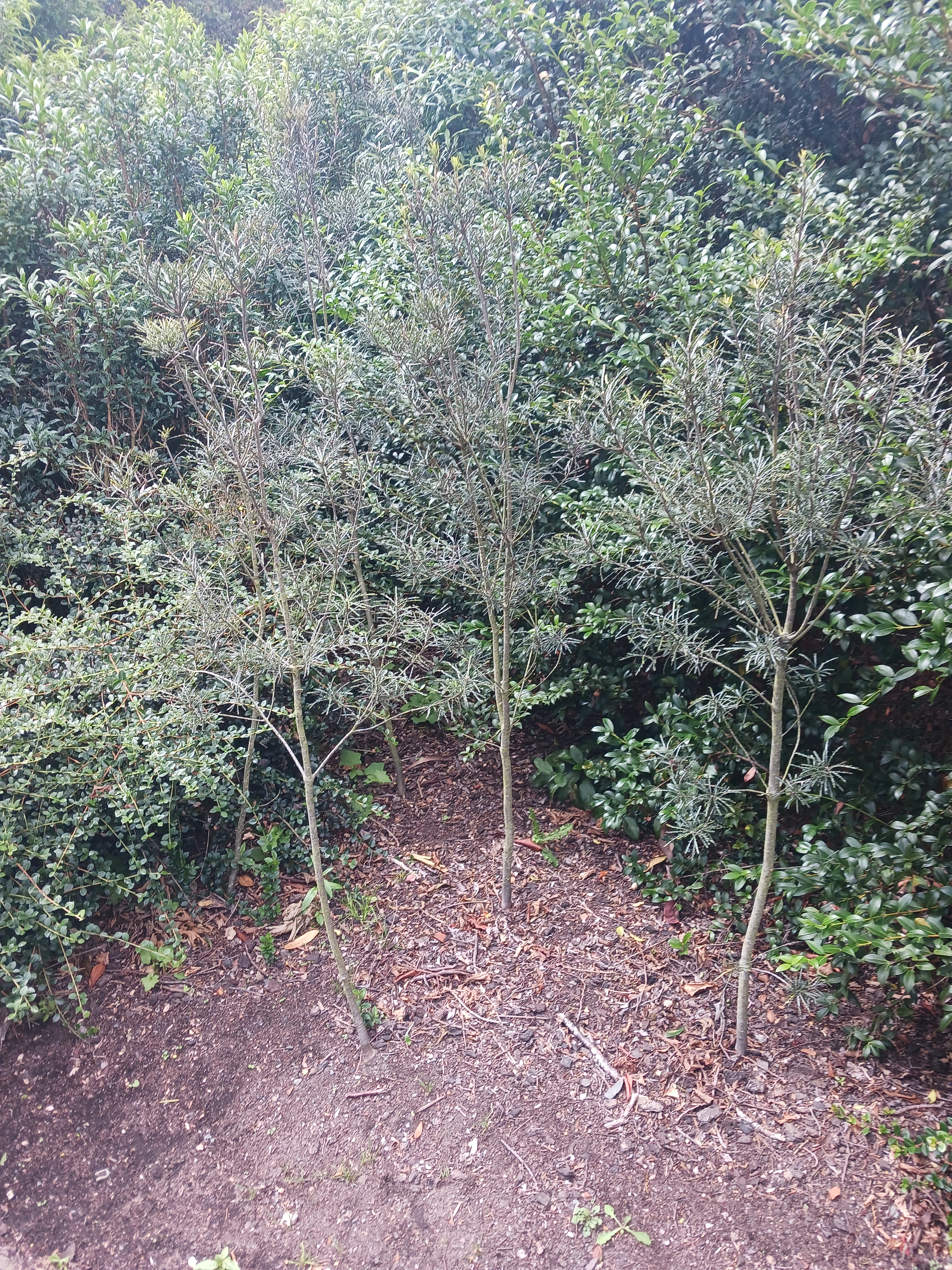
Group of juvenile Pittosporum patulum at the Dunedin Botanic Garden

Pittosporum patulum is restricted to sub-alpine sites in canopy gaps in mountain beech forest above 800 metres (2625 ft). The majority of adult plants are located in open and exposed sites such as: avalanche terrain, river margins, on bluffs. It is uncommon and may be threatened by grazing and by alien herbivores.

== Conservation ==
It is listed in the IUCN Red List as Endangered, and on the New Zealand Threat Classification System as Nationally Endangered. In 1999, a recovery plan was approved by the director-general of the Department of Conservation.

Ungulates (hoofed mammals) typically feed on juvenile foliage, and opossums eat both the juvenile and adult foliage as well as the flowers of P. patulum. Rodents feed on the seed dropped beneath adult trees, and insect browsing can deform new growth.

It is occasionally cultivated.
