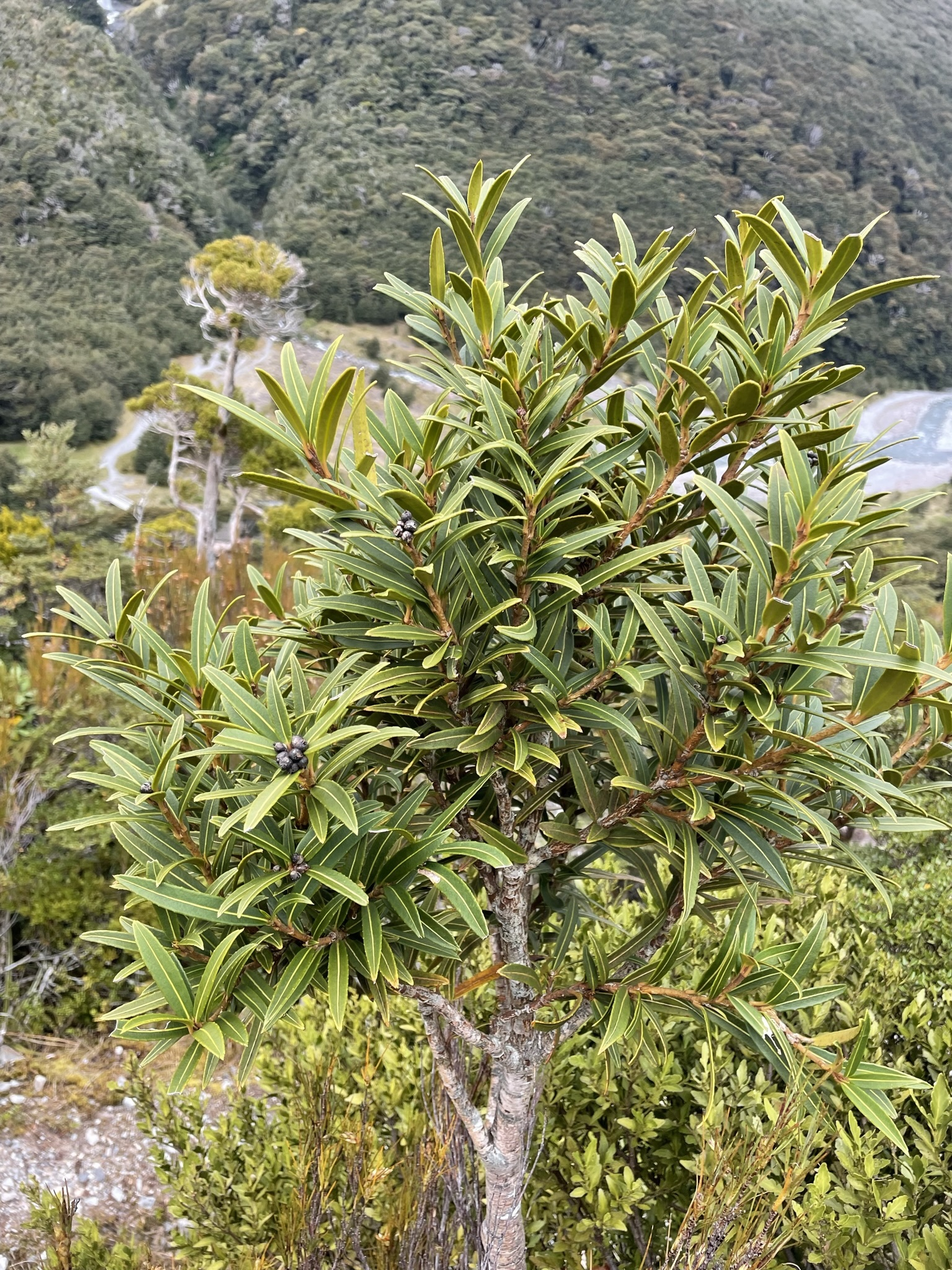
- An adult Pseudopanax linearis in Arthur's Pass National Park.

Conservation status
- Not Threatened (NZ TCS)

Scientific classification
- Kingdom: Plantae
- Clade: Tracheophytes
- Clade: Angiosperms
- Clade: Eudicots
- Clade: Asterids
- Order: Apiales
- Family: Araliaceae
- Genus: Pseudopanax
- Species: P. linearis

Binomial name
- Pseudopanax linearis (Hook.f.) K.Koch

Synonyms
- Panax linearis (Hook.f.); Nothopanax linearis (Hook.f.) Harms

= Pseudopanax linearis =

Species of shrub or small tree

Pseudopanax linearis, also known as mountain lancewood, is a species of heteroblastic shrub or small tree from the family Araliaceae, endemic to the South Island of New Zealand. Within the South Island, it is found in subalpine scrub and high-altitude forest environments relatively west of the Southern Alps.

This species typically grows to be 3 metres (9.8 feet) tall and appears with long, narrow, and slightly serrated green or brown leaves. Juvenile leaves are longer than adult leaves and have a more prominent serrated margin. In summer, the adult plant produces small yellow-green flowers, which are followed by small purple fruit.

It is known to have interactions like pollination and predation with birds, insects, and mammals.

Pseudopanax linearis is closely related and morphologically similar to two other lancewood species, Pseudopanax crassifolius and Pseudopanax ferox, but is physically distinct in that it is smaller in size, leaves are shorter in all growth stages, and juvenile leaves extend horizontally or upwards from the stem rather than downwards. The transition between a juvenile and adult growth form is also much less notable in P. linearis than in the other lancewoods as well.

== Description ==
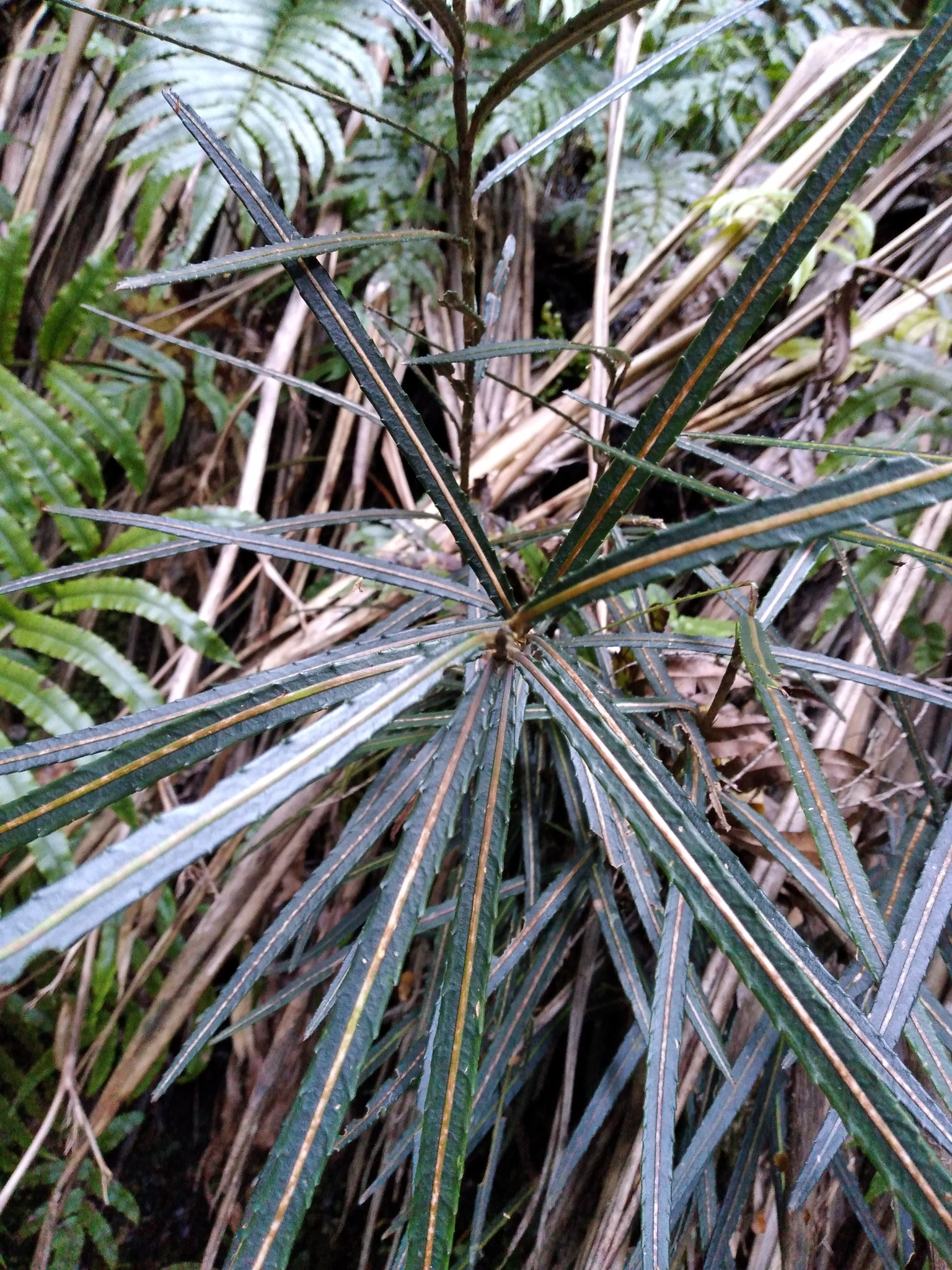
Juvenile leaves of Pseudopanax linearis

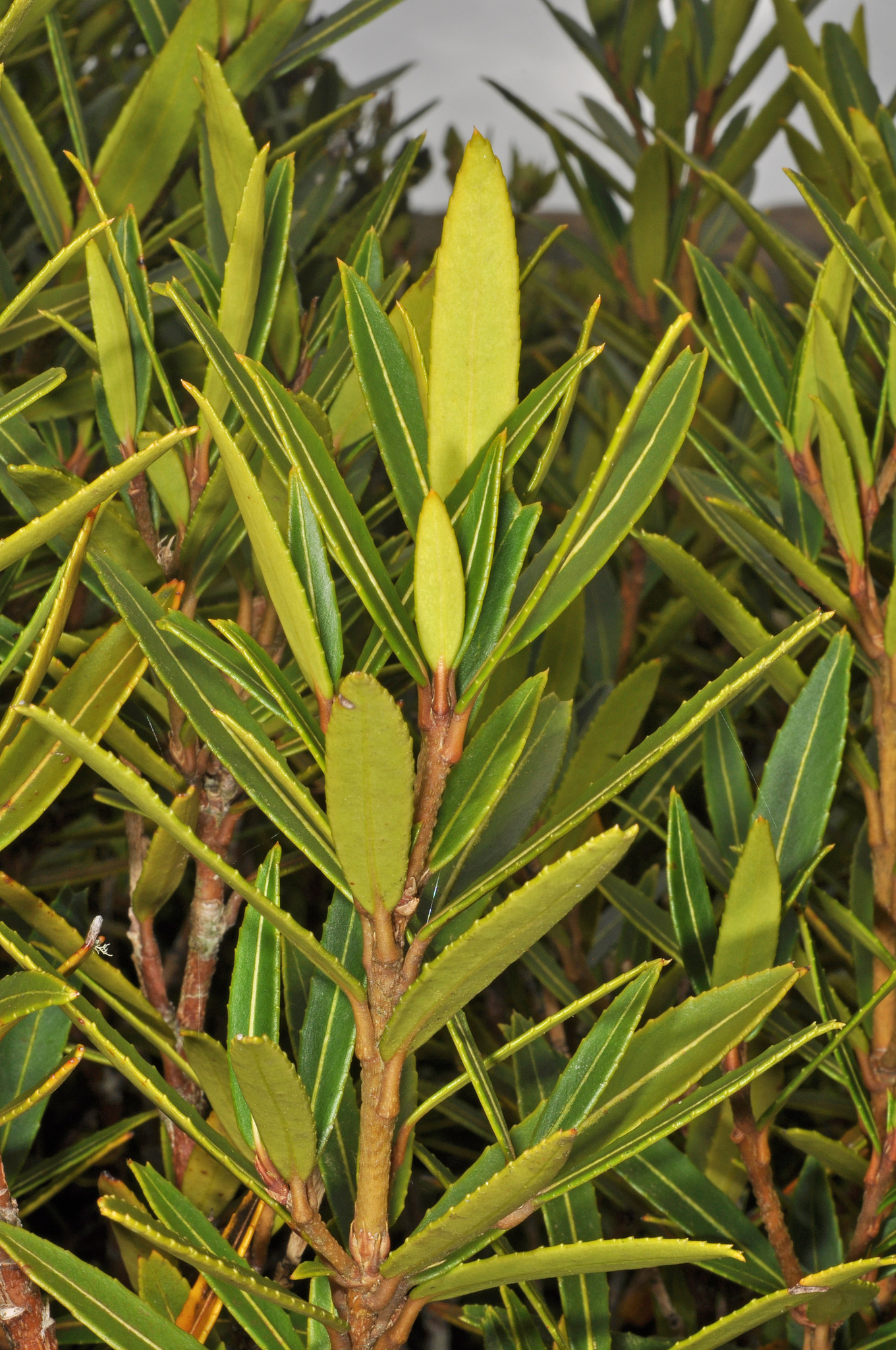
Adult leaves of Pseudopanax linearis

Pseudopanax linearis is a heteroblastic shrub or small tree. It typically grows to be 3 m (9.8 ft) tall (but can reach up to 5–7 m (16–23 ft) tall), with a trunk 15 cm (5.9 in) in diameter. Being heteroblastic, it transitions between juvenile and adult leaf forms depending on its height, which is said to be around 1–2 m (3 ft 3 in – 6 ft 7 in) above ground.

Juvenile leaves are very thick, narrow, and linear in shape, being 15–25 cm (5.9–9.8 in) long and 0.5–1 cm (1/4–1/2 in) wide, and grow on a short and thick petiole. The upper side of the leaf is a dark green or brown colour, while the underside is a pale to dark brown colour. They feature a crenate-serrate toothed leaf margin and a strongly raised pale-pink midrib, which is 1–1.5 mm wide. Juvenile leaves are ascending, growing horizontally or upwards.

Adult leaves are shorter and slightly wider than juvenile leaves, being 5–10 cm (2.0–3.9 in) long and 0.75–1 cm (1/4–1/2 in) wide. They are still thick but more linear-lanceolate in shape with a rounded obtuse or pointed acute leaf tip. The adult leaves also grow on thick petioles, 5 mm long, but have a slightly less prominent toothed or smooth leaf margin. Leaves are simple and alternate, with adult leaves tending to crowd at the tips of the branchlets.

It produces flowers in small, compound, terminal (or sometimes axillary) umbels. They are attached to short peduncles or directly to the plant's stem. Individual flowers are small, 5 mm in diameter, and a pale yellow-green colour. The male flower has five stamens and five petals. The female flower has a 3–5-celled connate (joined at base) style that has backwards-curving tips, a 3–5-loculed ovary, and no petals.

Fruits are purple when ripe and an oblong to ovate shape, around 5 mm long. It has 3–5 locules.

The bark of P. linearis is smooth and a pale grey colour. A juvenile Pseudopanax linearis is slender and unbranched, while an adult has a small crown with few, spreading branches.

== Range ==
=== Natural global range ===
Pseudopanax linearis is endemic to New Zealand.

=== New Zealand range ===
Pseudopanax linearis is found in the South Island of New Zealand. It is found mostly on the western divide of the South Island, generally west of the Southern Alps from north-west Nelson to Southland.

== Habitat ==
Pseudopanax linearis is found in subalpine scrub to montane, high-altitude forests in damper regions of the South Island as a canopy or subcanopy species. It is generally known as a "high-altitude equivalent of the lancewoods," hence the common name, mountain lancewood. It has been noted to commonly associate with silver beech. It has also been found to grow on imperfectly drained soils and gley podzol soils (podzols being associated with high rainfall).

== Ecology ==
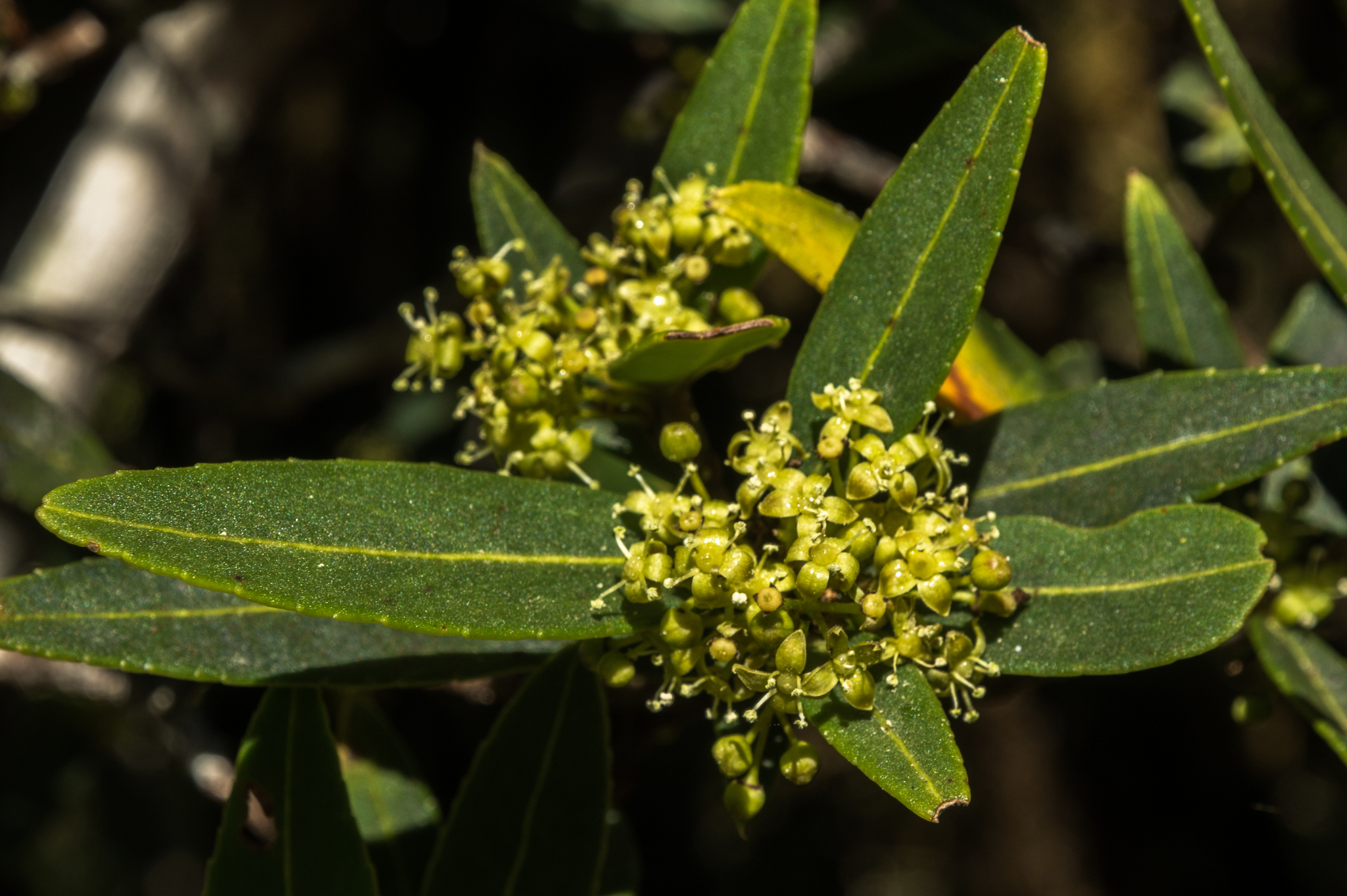
Pseudopanax linearis flowers in December

=== Phenology and reproduction ===
Flowering occurs in summer (around January). The plant's flowers are pollinated by insects and its seeds are dispersed by birds.

=== Predators, parasites, and diseases ===
Birds are known to eat the fruits of P. linearis.

Pollination occurs because insects like the western honey bee collect pollen and nectar from the plant's flowers. The scale insect Ctenochiton viridis uses P. linearis as a host.

Mammals that have been introduced to New Zealand will predate P. linearis. Pseudopanax linearis is predated by deer, which often browse on the tip of the plant's stem. This browsing can deform the plant's stem, which negatively impacts the growth of P. linearis. The Himalayan tahr is also recorded to predate this species.
