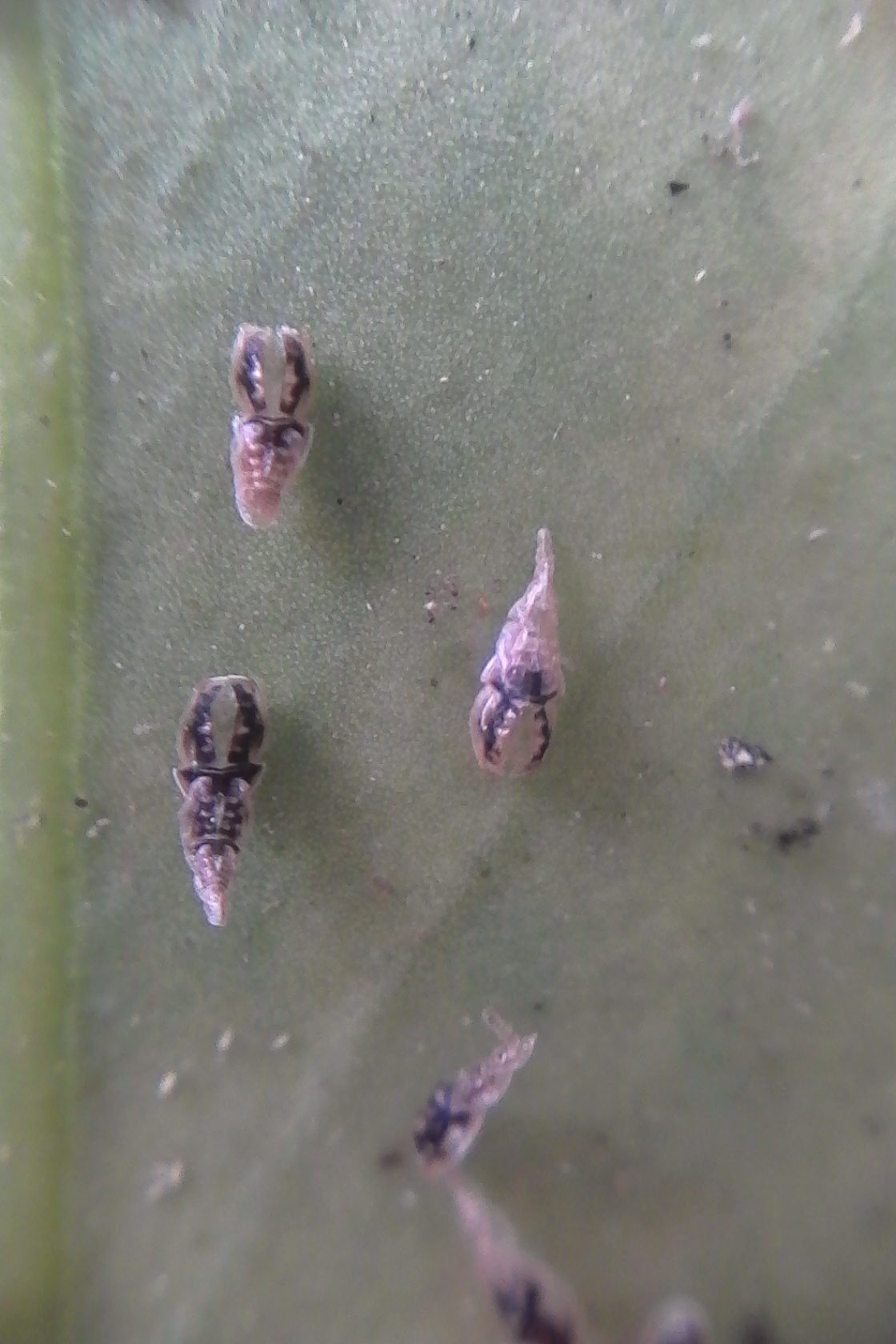
- Powellia panacis in Auckland

Scientific classification
- Kingdom: Animalia
- Phylum: Arthropoda
- Class: Insecta
- Order: Hemiptera
- Suborder: Sternorrhyncha
- Family: Triozidae
- Genus: Powellia
- Species: P. panacis

Binomial name
- Powellia panacis (Maskell, 1890)

Synonyms
- Trioza panacis Maskell, 1890

= Powellia panacis =

Species of insect

Powellia panacis, the lancewood psyllid, is a species of insect, endemic to New Zealand. It is associated with Pseudopanax species, particularly Pseudopanax ferox. It is known from both the North and South Island.

The species was originally described by William Miles Maskell. The species was previously combined with the genus Trioza, and was recently recombined.
