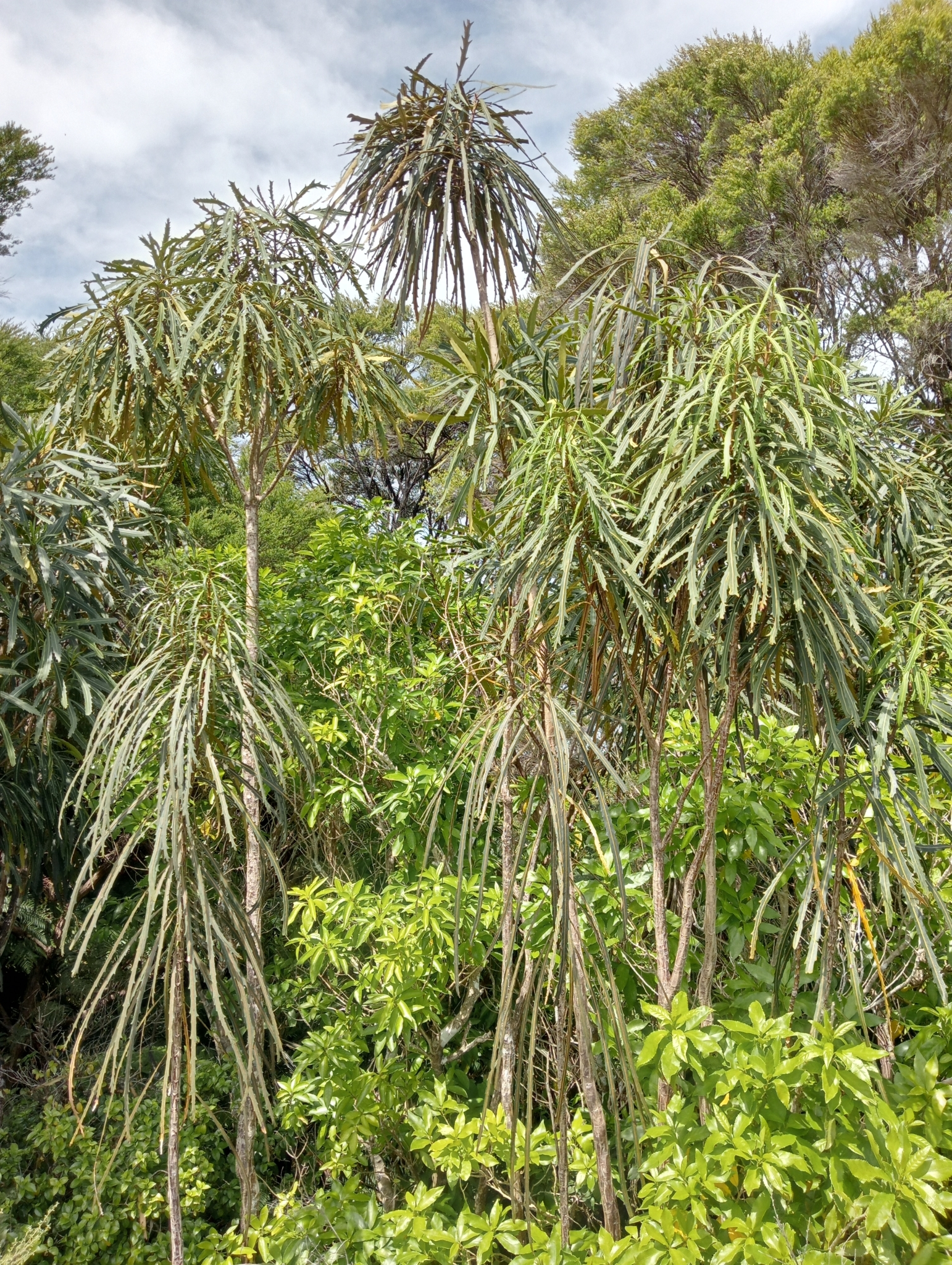
- A group of lancewood (P. crassifolius) trees in a forest in the Māhia Peninsula.

Conservation status
- Not Threatened (NZ TCS)

Scientific classification
- Kingdom: Plantae
- Clade: Tracheophytes
- Clade: Angiosperms
- Clade: Eudicots
- Clade: Asterids
- Order: Apiales
- Family: Araliaceae
- Genus: Pseudopanax
- Species: P. crassifolius

Binomial name
- Pseudopanax crassifolius (Sol. ex A.Cunn.) C.Koch

= Pseudopanax crassifolius =

Species of tree endemic to New Zealand

Pseudopanax crassifolius, also known as horoeka or lancewood, is a heteroblastic tree belonging to the family Araliaceae. It is endemic to New Zealand and found throughout the country from sea level up to about 750 metres (2,460 feet) in lowland to montane shrublands and forests.

The juvenile form, which lasts between 15 and 20 years, is easily recognised. The leaves are stiff and leathery with a prominent central rib, about 1 cm wide and up to 1 m long with irregular teeth, all growing downwards from a central stem. The young trunk has characteristic vertical swollen ridges. As the tree gets older the stem begins to branch, producing a bushy top. The leaves also become wider and shorter, losing their teeth. It is only when the tree is mature that it adopts a typical tree shape.

The difference between the juvenile and adult tree's appearance is so drastic that the two forms were initially described as separate species and even genera by early botanists, including the botanists accompanying Captain James Cook during his first voyage to New Zealand.

One of the theories about this curious change of appearance is that the young plant had to protect itself against browsing by the moa, a group of giant flightless birds that once roamed New Zealand's bush. Once above moa height, it was out of danger and turns into a "regular" tree. A study of leaf colour development in P. crassifolius found that leaves of seedlings would blend with leaf litter, while juvenile leaf colouration would draw attention to their spines. A closely related Chatham Island species, which evolved in the absence of moa, did not display these changes.

Closely related is Pseudopanax ferox, the toothed lancewood. It is similar to P. crassifolius except the leaves are more abundant and severely toothed, resembling remotely a bandsaw blade.

== Description ==
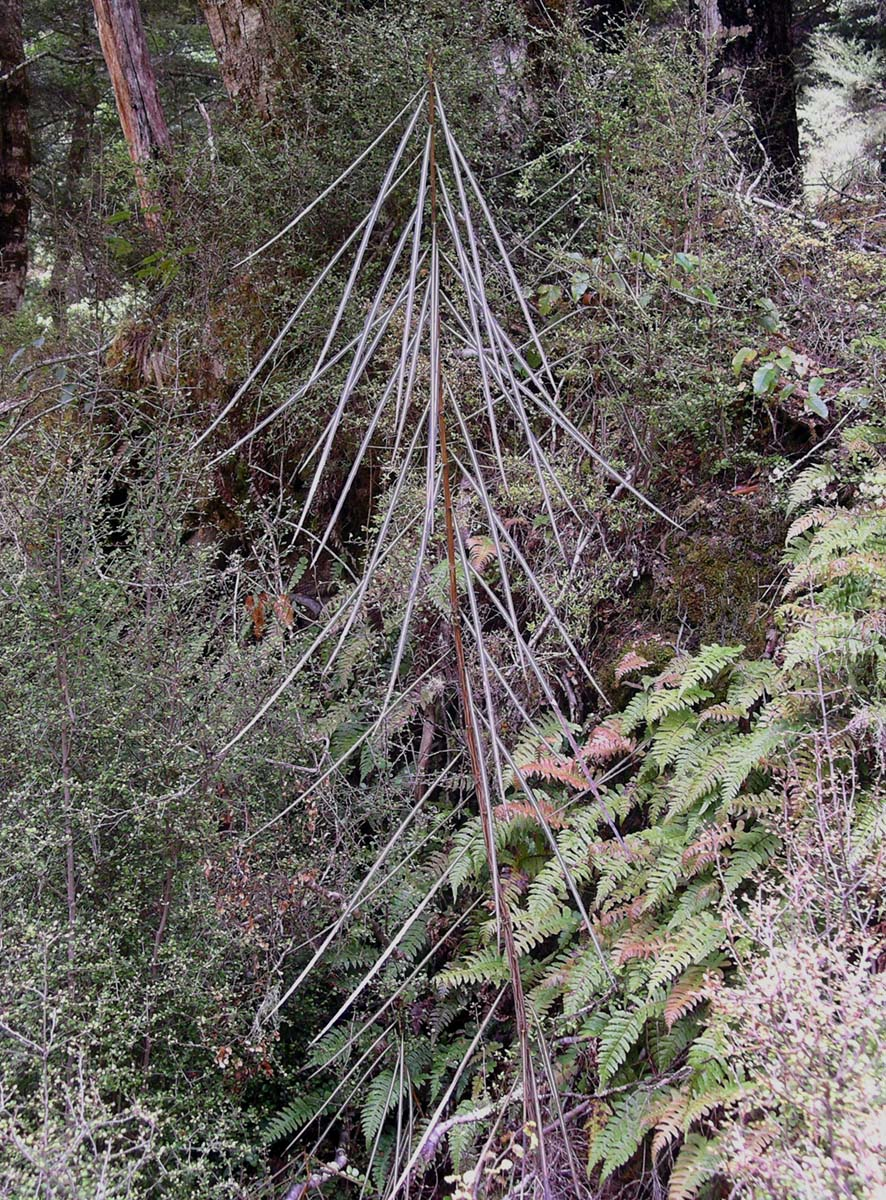
Juvenile Pseudopanax crassifolius tree

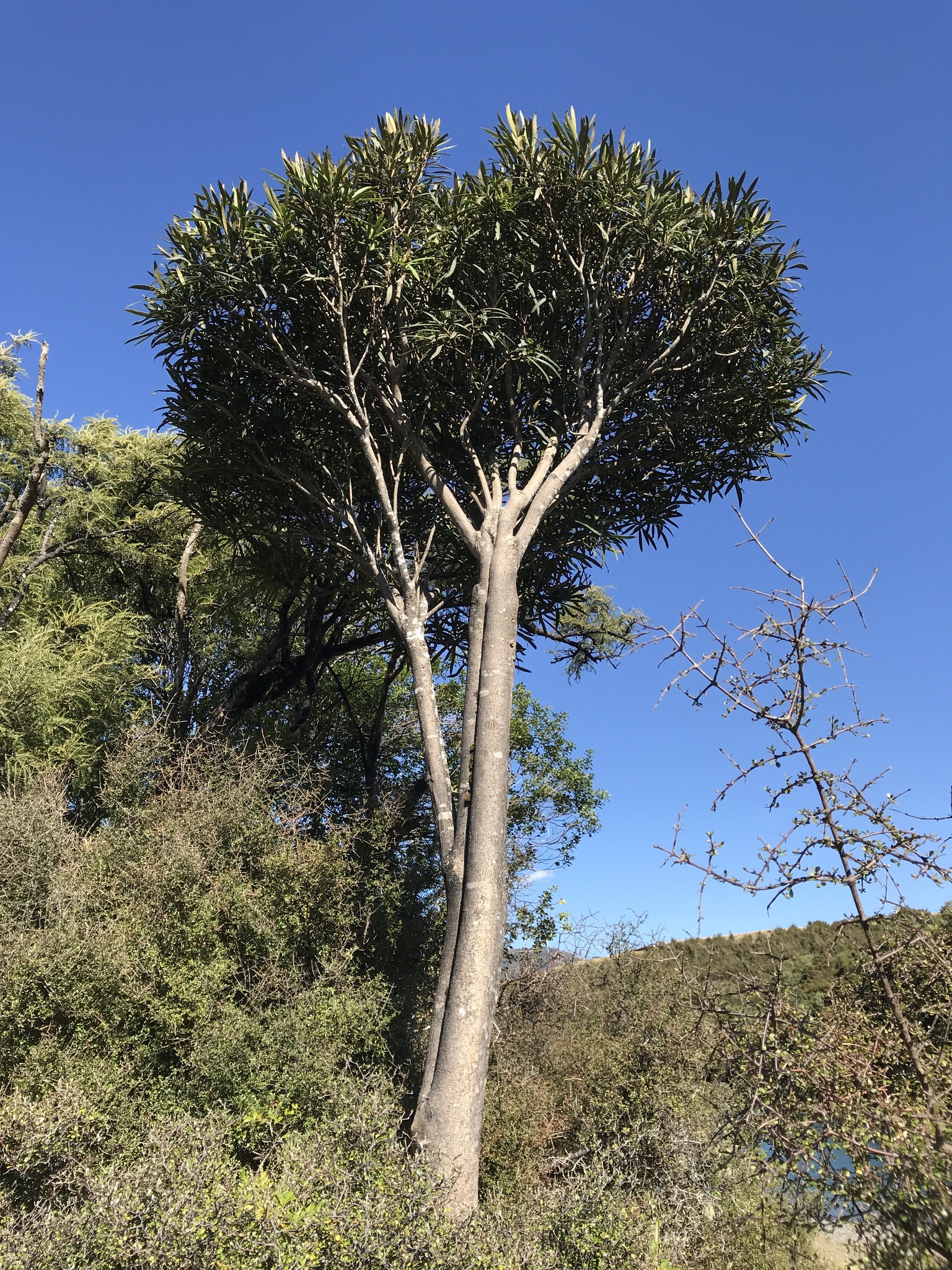
Adult Pseudopanax crassifolius tree

Pseudopanax crassifolius is a heteroblastic plant, meaning that it has different leaf forms and growth habits depending on its growth stage. These growth stages, which are largely related to the plant height, are: seedling, juvenile, transitional, and adult.

A juvenile tree is single-stemmed with long and narrow deflexed leaves, typically below the height of 3–5 m (9.8–16.4 ft).

As an adult, P. crassifolius can reach a height of 15 m. It appears as a round-headed tree due to being multi-branched, making it look more like a "typical tree" than its previous forms.

=== Leaves ===
Seedling leaves are smaller and thinner compared to the following growth stages, but they gradually become longer as the plant grows out from the leaf litter, starting from cotyledon. Leaves are initially green but become more mottled brown and leathery as the plant grows.

Juvenile leaves, which are produced up to 4 m (13 ft) or before the tree branches, are especially long and narrow (1 m (3 ft 3 in) long by 1–1.5 cm (0.39–0.59 in) wide) – similar in shape to a lance. They are dark green with a sharply toothed margin and prominent yellow or orange midrib. Leaves are also rigid and straight, but angled downwards from the stem, 45–60º from horizontal.

Intermediate leaves appear once the tree has branched, typically above the height of 4–5 m. They are an intermediate between juvenile and adult leaves, being shorter and wider than juvenile leaves.

Adult leaves are shorter and wider (10–20 cm (3.9–7.9 in) long by 2–3 cm (0.79–1.18 in) wide), with a less prominent midrib and toothed or entire margin. Additionally, leaves are simple, alternate, and grow outwards or upwards from the branch. They typically appear once the tree is above 5 m and branched. Adult leaves also have greater frost resistance than juvenile leaves.

=== Trunk ===
The trunk of a juvenile tree is slender, straight, unbranched, and ridged down its length.

For adult trees, the trunk can be up to 50 cm (20 in) in diameter. It has horizontal lenticels and smooth, grey, or mottled bark. At this life stage, the top of the tree has branched and the juvenile leaves have fallen off, producing a rounded head with a naked stem.

=== Flowers ===
The tiny, 4 mm (0.16 in) diameter, pale yellow to green flowers are clustered in large terminal umbels, 30 cm (12 in) across. The flowers are bisexual, so they have five stamens and five styles.

=== Fruits ===
The fleshy fruits, which are usually dark purple to black when ripe, are 3–4 mm (0.12–0.16 in) in diameter and round. They contain five seeds per berry, with the five locules each containing one seed.

== Taxonomy ==
The species was first described by Daniel Solander in his unpublished manuscripts detailing the First voyage of James Cook in 1779. Solander The juvenile and adult forms of the plant were so visually different that Solander used two different names for the plant: Aralis crassifolia for the adult form, and Xerophylla longifolia for the juvenile form. The first formal description of the plant was made in 1839 by Allan Cunningham, who retained the name Aralis crassifolia. In 1859, Karl Koch placed the species in the genus Pseudopanax, which remains the modern scientific name used today.

== Etymology ==
The species epithet crassifolius means "thick leaved". The Māori language name horoeka likely derived from Proto-Polynesian *Solo[w]eka or *Qoromea, both hypothetical words used to refer to unknown species of tree. Possible cognates include Tahitian oroea, used to describe Cyclophyllum barbatum, Rennellese kogomea, a word for Hibiscus cooperi, and Hawaiian olomea, used to describe Perrottetia sandwicensis. All three lancewood species (P. crassifolius, P. ferox, and P. linearis) are known as horoeka by Māori.

The English language name lancewood refers to the Māori cultural use of the juvenile plant as a lance for bird hunting. An alternative early name no longer in use is the "fishbone tree", a reference of the juvenile plant's leaves resembling the spine and ribs of a fish.

== Range ==
Pseudopanax crassifolius is endemic to New Zealand. It is abundant and widespread in the North Island, South Island, and Stewart Island.

== Habitat ==
Pseudopanax crassifolius occurs from sea level up to about 750 m (2,460 ft) in lowland to montane forests and shrublands. It does not have a strong affinity for wet habitats, as it usually occurs in uplands/non-wetlands. Instead, this species is often growing along forest margins or gaps, in regenerating forests, and as a subcanopy or canopy tree.

Specifically, P. crassifolius is a common subcanopy or canopy species in a kāmahi — silver fern forest (Beech-broadleaved-podocarp forest Alliances), hard beech – kāmahi forest (Beech forest Alliances), silver beech-red beech-kāmahi forest (Beech-broadleaved forest Alliances), Silver fern - mahoe forest, tōwai – tawa forest, and kāmahi-podocarp forest (Broadleaved-podocarp forest Alliances including kauri).

== Ecology ==
=== Phenology and reproduction ===
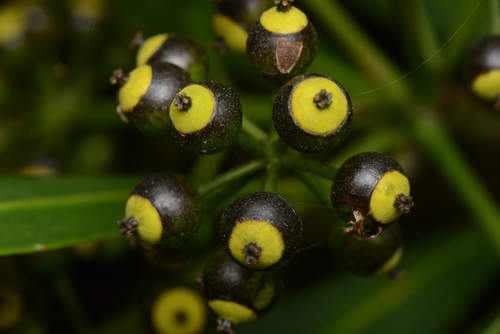
Fruits of Pseudopanax crassifolius

The juvenile form of P. crassifolius lasts between 15 and 20 years before it transitions into its adult form.

The tree almost only flowers and fruits when it is an adult. Its bisexual flowers are in full bloom from January to April and are pollinated by insects. Fruits are produced in January to April, ripen through the winter, and persist until August. These fruits are eaten and then dispersed by birds. Passing through a bird's gut strips the seed of its fleshy mesocarp coat, which helps it germinate. Subsequently, these seeds were found to germinate after five weeks but this may be delayed if the fleshy mesocarp is still intact.

Pseudopanax crassifolius is evergreen.

=== Predators, parasites, and diseases ===
==== Birds ====
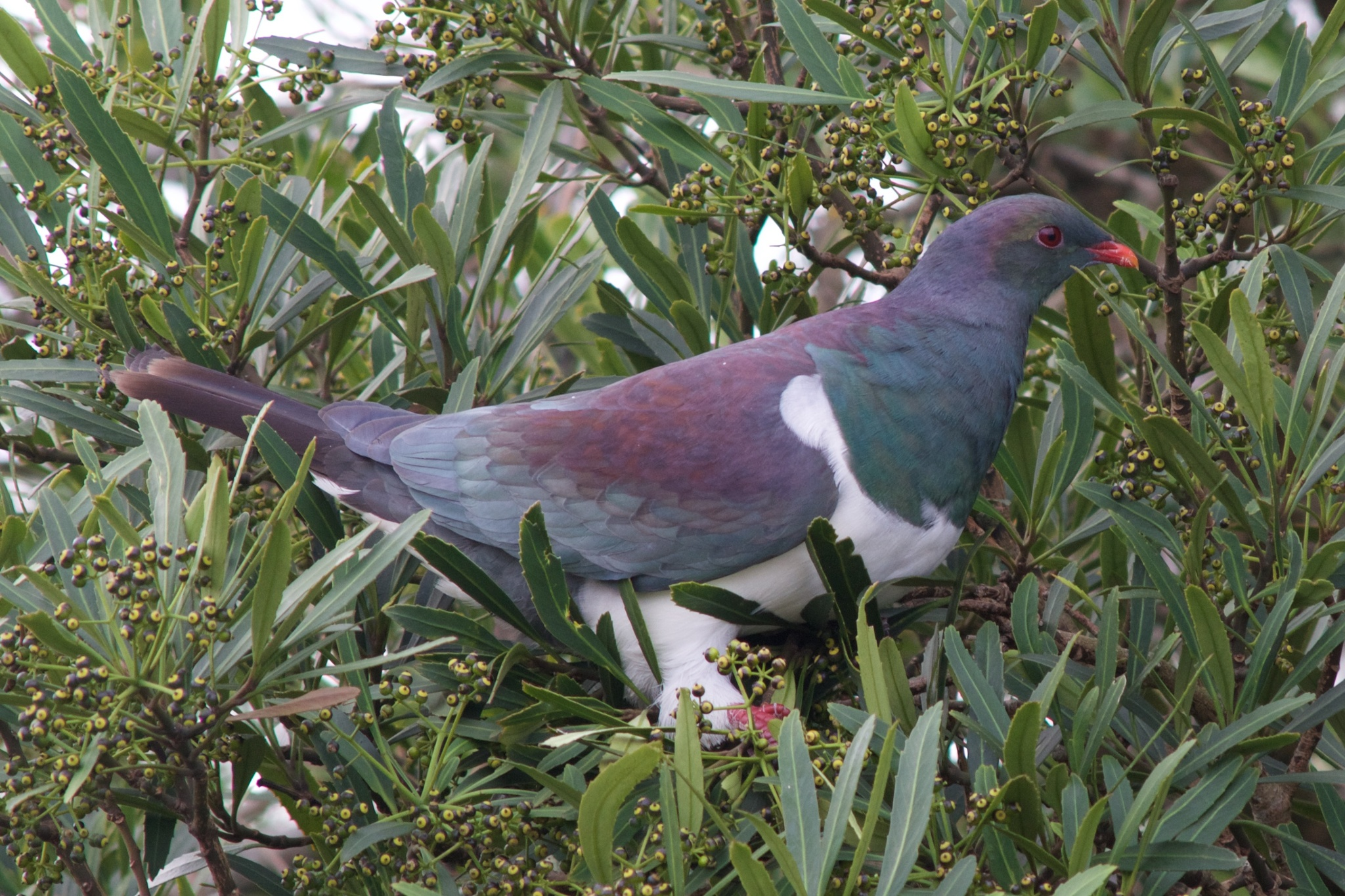
Kererū feeding on Pseudopanax crassifolius fruit

The berries serve as an important food source for many birds. This includes birds like the hihi, North Island kōkako, whitehead, tūī, kererū, silvereye, New Zealand bellbird, New Zealand kākā, brown creeper, grey warbler, tomtit, blackbird, and chaffinch.

Its flowers also provide nectar, which honey-eating birds like the hihi, tūī, and New Zealand bellbird use for food.

As well as the fruit, kererū will also eat the leaf buds of P. crassifolius.

Birds are also known to forage for invertebrates on P. crassifolius. This includes the kākā, rifleman, brown creeper, grey warbler, tomtit, New Zealand fantail, silvereye, and New Zealand bellbird.

Although extinct, it is also believed that the moa may have once predated this plant, specifically its leaves.

==== Invertebrates ====
Bees introduced and native to New Zealand, like the western honey bee or Lasioglossum sordidum, will use this species for nectar when it is flowering. As a result, beekeepers believe P. crassifolius to be good bee forage and recommend it on farms.

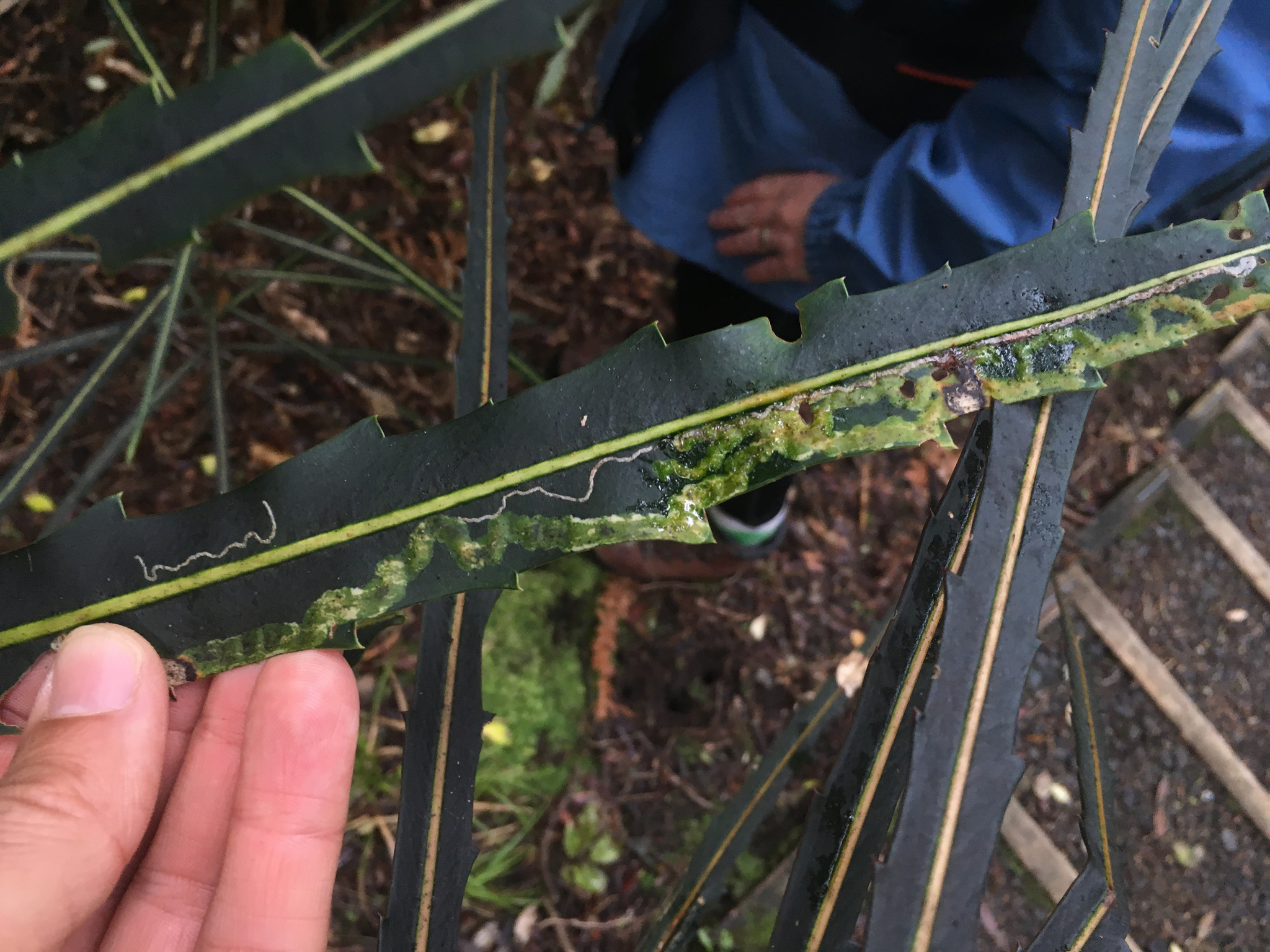
Eumetriochroa panacivagans leaf mine on juvenile Pseudopanax crassifolius leaf

Moth species Acrocercops panacivagans and Eumetriochroa panacivagansis are known to use Pseudopanax species like P. crassifolias as hosts. This is evident through the mines they create in the leaves. Another moth species, Izatha blepharidota, will also take this plant as a host, with its larvae successfully reared and feeding on the dead branches of P. crassifolius.

The New Zealand praying mantis will deposit its ootheca on P. crassifolius.

Many beetle species are known to parasitise P. crassifolius, commonly by using it as a host. Weevil species from the family Curculionidae and Belidae have larvae that live in dead, or dying, woody parts of P. crassifolius, including Dendrotrupes vestitus, Ectopsis ferrugalis, Platypus apicalis, Scolopterus penicillatus, Stephanorhynchus curvipes, Psepholax simplex, Psepholax mediocris, Psepholax crassicornis, Mesoreda sulcifrons, Crisius semifuscus, Clypeolus pascoei, Phronira osculans, Dendrotrupes costiceps and Aralius wollastoni. Two longhorn beetle species, Tetrorea cilipes and Hexatricha pulverulenta from the family Cerambycidae, have larvae that tunnel in the woody parts of trees and are believed to use P. crassifolius as a host.

Scale insects will use P. crassifolius as a host plant by living on its leaves, petioles, fruit, and stems. Notably, Trioza panacis, also known as the lancewood psyllid, will feed on the leaves of P. crassifolius and a few other Pseudopanax species. Additional scale insect species include those from the family Diaspididae, such as Leucaspis gigas, Leucaspis mixta, Leucaspis morrisi, and Hemiberlesia lataniae. From the family Coccidae, this includes the soft-scale insect species Ctenochiton viridis and Coccus hesperidum. Felted scale insects from the family Eriococcidae, like Scutare fimbriata and Eriococcus parabilis. Finally, from the family Rhyparochromidae, Woodwardiana evagorata will feed on the leaves of P. crassifolius.

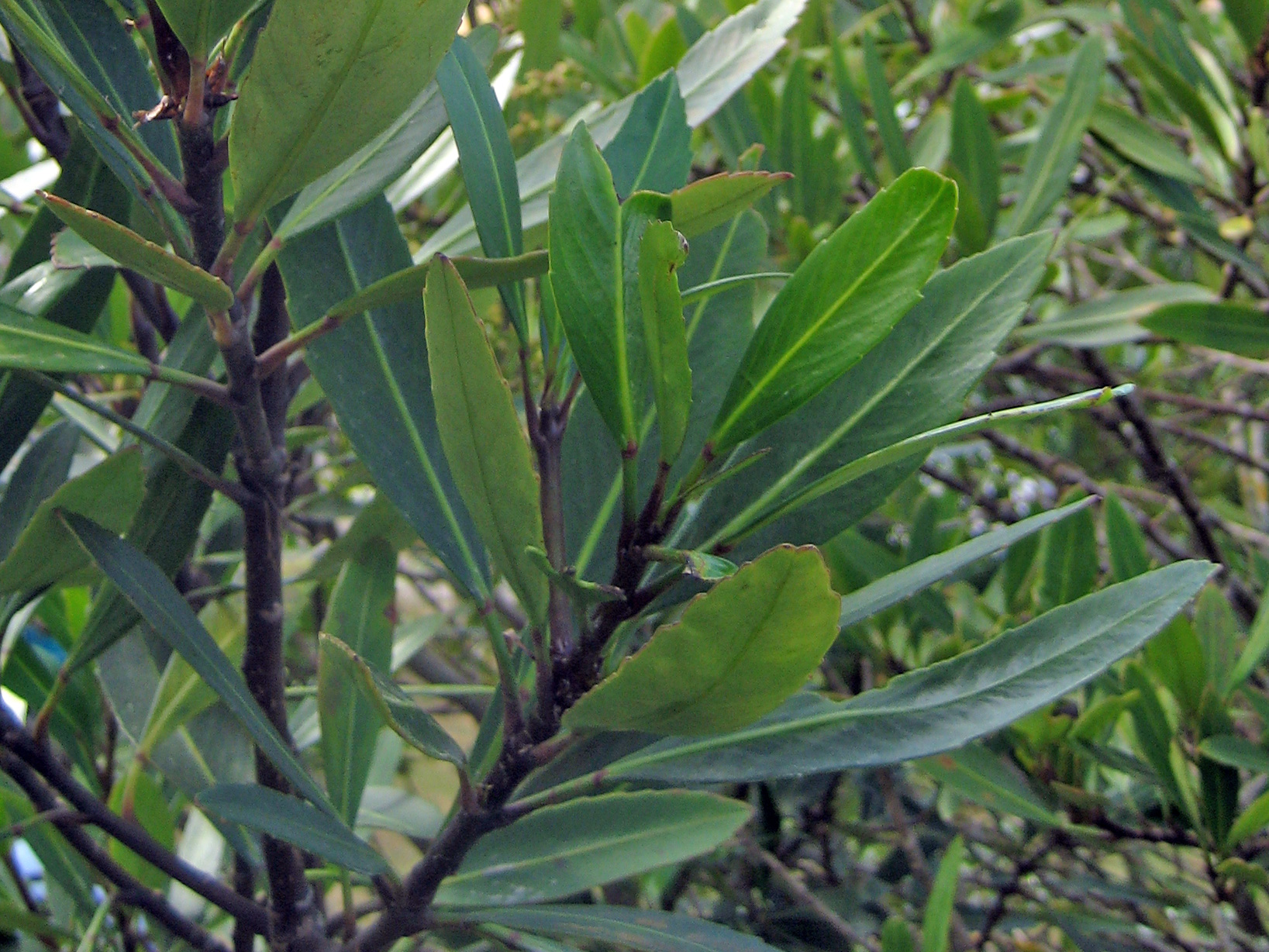
Adult leaves of Pseudopanax crassifolius

==== Mammals ====
Pseudopanax crassifolius leaves are palatable and preferred by mammals introduced to New Zealand, such as cattle, deer, brushtailed possums, and feral goats. The leaves of a mature P. crassifolius tree are known to have a higher nutritive value compared to its juvenile form, which may make them more appealing to these mammals. Alongside leaves, the berries of P. crassifolius are eaten by brushtail possums. Rats will also predate P. crassifolius, as they are known to eat its seeds.

==== Plants ====
The parasitic plant Dactylanthus taylorii has been reported to grow on the roots of P. crassifolius, where it steals nutrients by causing the roots to enlarge.

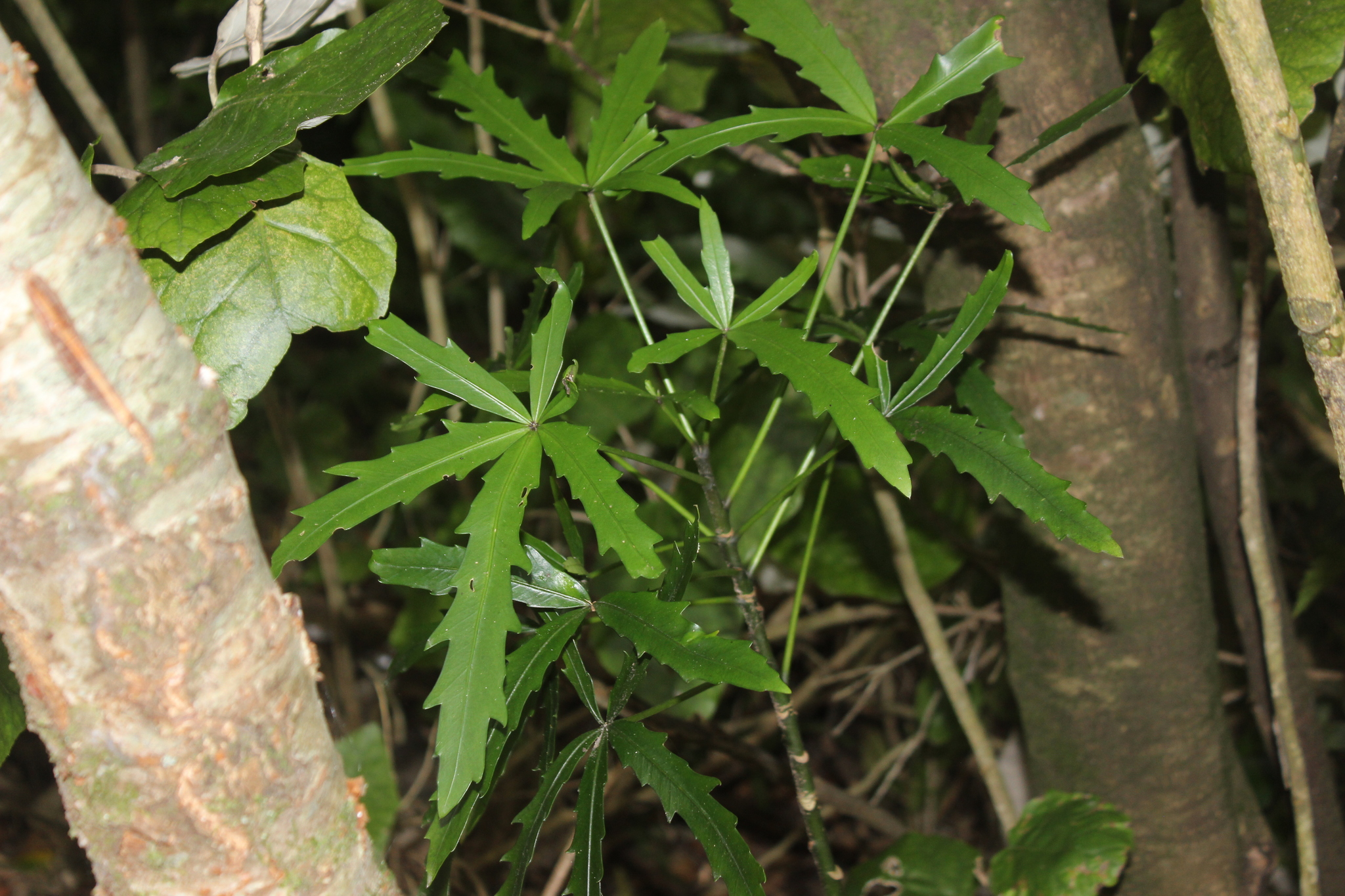
One example of Pseudopanax crassifolius × lessonii hybrid leaf morphology

==== Fungi ====
Chaenothecopsis schefflerae, a fungus that lives on plant exudate or exudate-soaked wood or bark, has been found on P. crassifolius.

=== Hybrids ===
Pseudopanax crassifolius commonly hybridises with Pseudopanax lessonii. Given the two species' dissimilar appearances, they produce a range of morphologically diverse offspring, with leaves often appearing different to both parent species. Despite this, Pseudopanax crassifolius hybridises with P. lessonnii significantly more frequently than with morphologically similar Pseudopanax species, such as Pseudopanax ferox or Pseudopanax linearis. One theory relating to this process is that P. crassifolius is more closely related to P. lessonnii and its allies than other Pseudopanax species.

== Evolution ==
The heteroblastic nature of this species has resulted in up to seven theories as to why it has evolved such distinct seedling, juvenile, and adult forms.

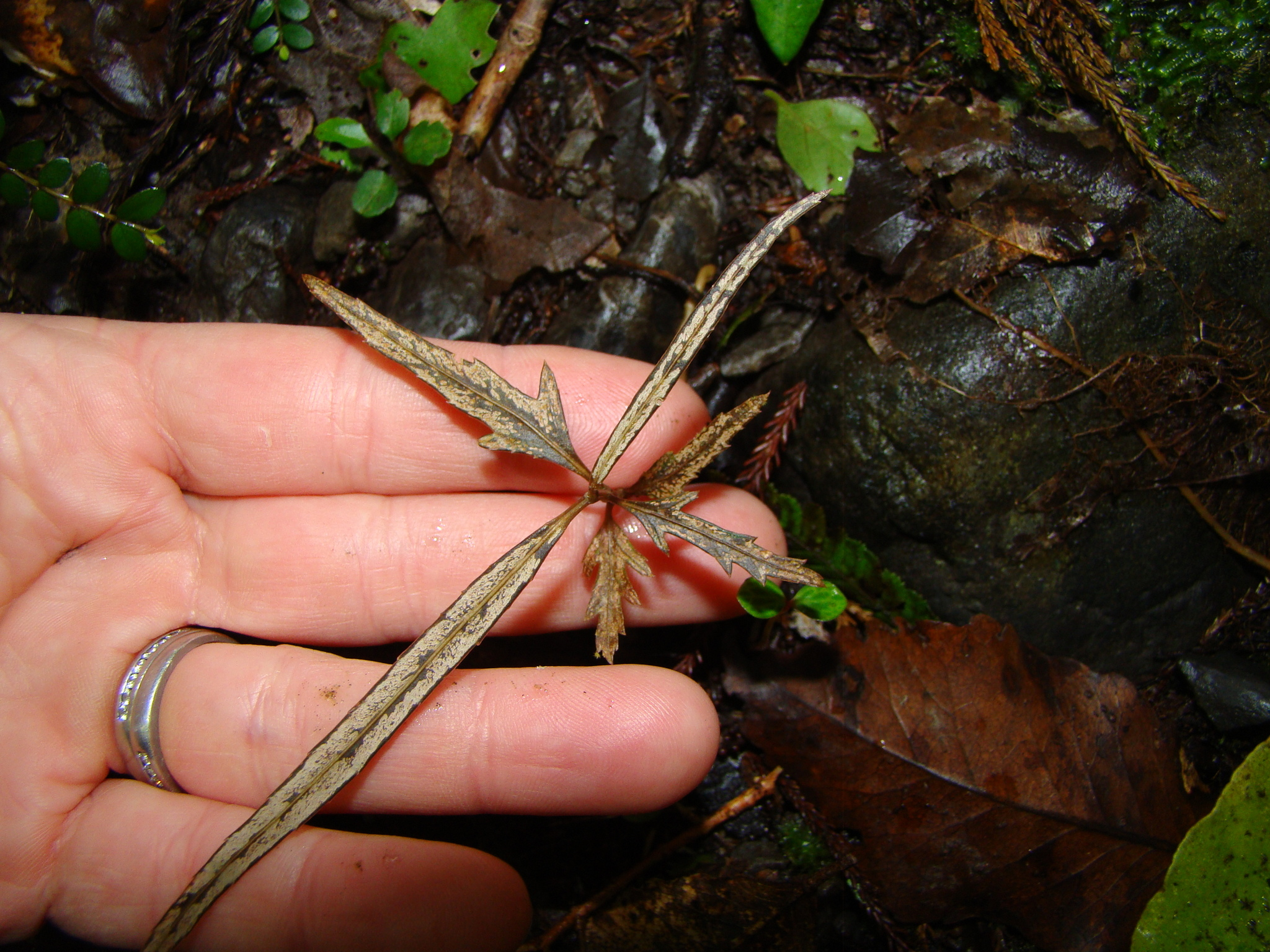
Brown Pseudopanax crassifolius seedling

One theory is that the heteroblasty of P. crassifolius evolved as a defensive adaptation to prevent and deter moa predation. The brown, mottled P. crassifolius seedling camouflages against leaf litter, which may have made it harder for moa to detect. Once the tree grows too tall to blend in with the leaf litter, researchers believe that the long, rigid juvenile leaves with teeth along the margin might deter moa browsing because they would be difficult to swallow. A highlighted coloured patch often seen along the teeth of the leaf may have warned moa to its defenses. The prominent midrib of the juvenile leaf allows it to be 13 times stronger than adult leaves, which would have made it more resistant to breakage by moa. It is also believed that once P. crassifolius is above 3 m in height, it exceeds the maximum browsing for moa. This may explain why we see the tree transition into its adult form, around this height, as it becomes less vulnerable to moa predation. Additionally, because moa were absent from the Chatham Islands, Pseudopanax chathamicus, a close relative of P. crassifolius that is endemic to the Chatham Islands, lacks the same defensive adaptations. Instead, the juvenile leaves of P. chathamicus are large and broad, with a smooth margin. Pseudopanax chathamicus leaves also appear the same green colour throughout its development, lacking the colour changes seen in P. crassifolius. Lastly, P. chathamicus begins branching as it transitions to an adult much earlier than P. crassifolius. These differences suggest that moa predation did influence the evolution of P. crassifolius.

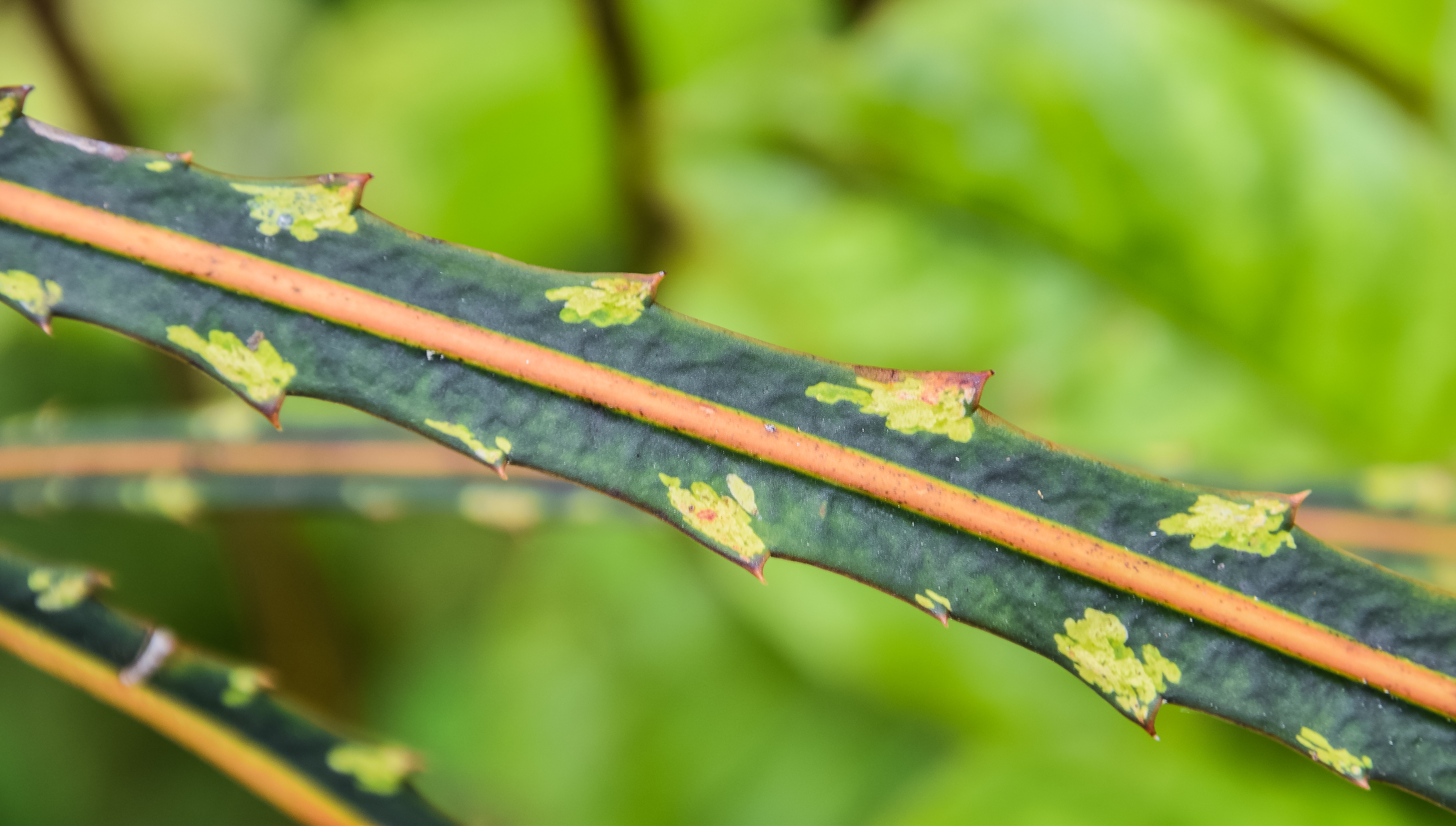
Juvenile Pseudopanax crassifolius leaf featuring distinctive colouring along its teeth

Another theory about the heteroblasty of P. crassifolius is that it evolved due to varying light intensities that the plant experiences as it grows from below to above the forest canopy. The seedling and juvenile leaves of P. crassifolius are thought to share morphological and anatomical traits with plants that commonly grow in low-light environments, while adult leaves share traits with plants that grow under the sun. As a juvenile, P. crassifolius often occurs as a partially shaded subcanopy tree before it eventually grows above the canopy as an adult. The deflexed orientation of its juvenile leaves optimises capture of low-intensity light received in the subcanopy environment. The subcanopy's low-light environment creates a low-energy, making the juvenile leaves low-cost to produce compared to the adult leaves. As P. crassifolius grows, it enters a high-light-intensity environment above the canopy, allowing it to produce large but expensive leaves as an adult. For these reasons, researchers believe that the juvenile form of P. crassifolius may be adapted for low-light intensity conditions, while the adult form is adapted to high-light intensity conditions. With that being said, one study found that species without heteroblasty (homoblastic species) had a greater survival rate than heteroblastic seedlings in a low-light intensity treatment, meaning that heteroblasty in P. crassifolius may not provide much advantage in a subcanopy environment.

== Uses ==
=== Urban design ===
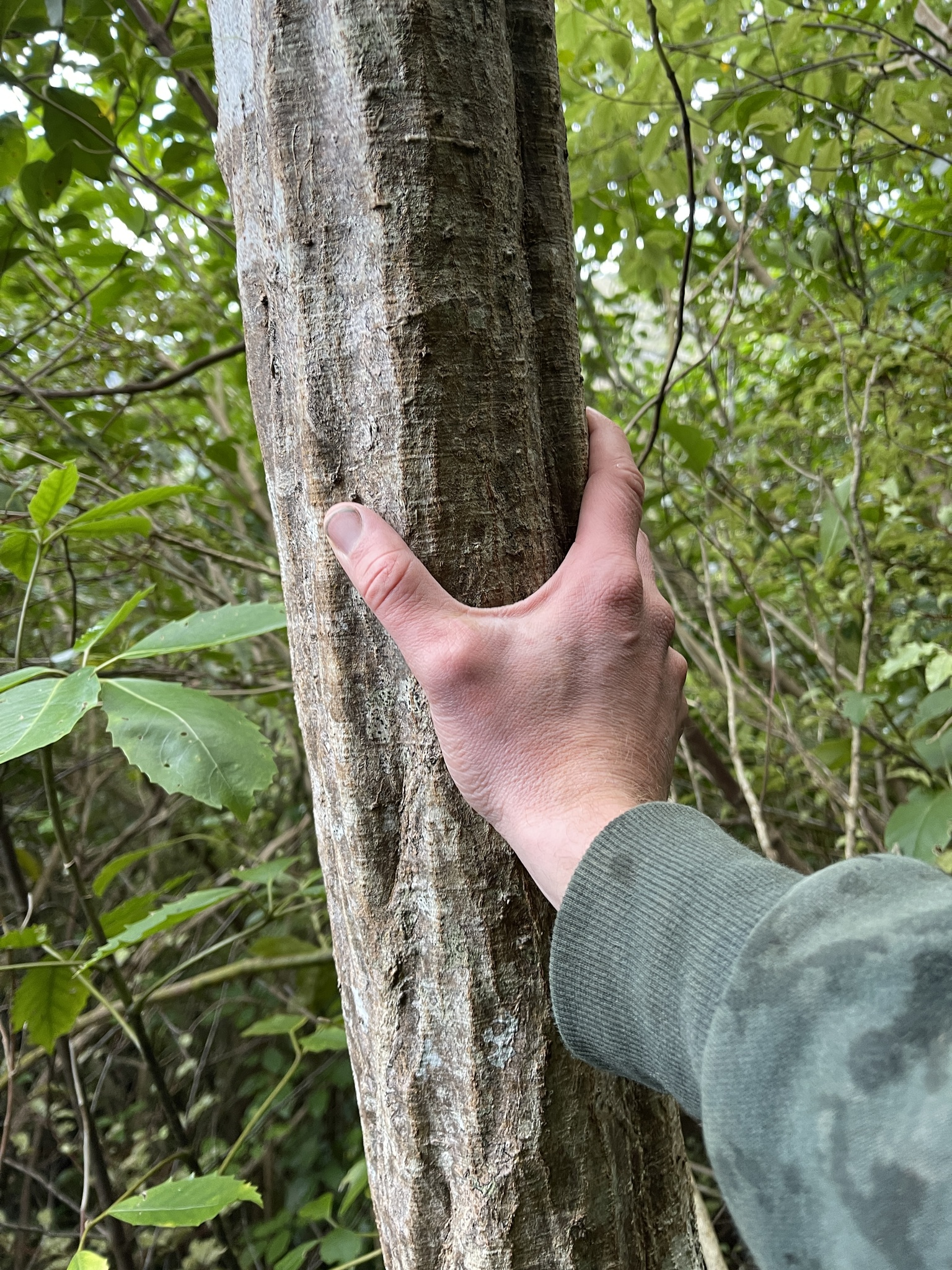
The trunk of an adult Pseudopanax crassifolius

Pseudopanax crassifolius is a popular plant in urban design not only for its iconic and charismatic appearance but also for its ecological benefits. Its unique look can be used to create textural contrast amongst other plants. Because of its thin and tall juvenile form, this species is also great in small spaces. For these reasons, this species is recommended along streets, entrance ways, traffic islands, or in the central island of roundabouts. It was once a choice wood for rod building

=== Early European settler use ===
The midribs of juvenile leaves were once used as bootlaces or in fixing horse bridles and harnesses. Its dense, light brown wood was used for fence posts or piles. In fact, its wood was once used for timber in Otago. However, the wood is not known to be very durable. Additionally, the flexible trunk would sometimes be used as a whip.

=== Traditional Māori use ===
Māori would use the stems of juvenile trees to spear kererū, while Māori specifically from the South Island would use P. crassifolius leaves to make paint brushes for rock paintings. Due to its flexibility, the trunk of a young P. crassifolius could be twisted and used as a tokotoko (ceremonial walking stick).

== In Māori culture ==
Māori thought that a flowering P. crassifolius indicated that birds would be abundant the following year because they would be attracted to the ripened fruit.

== Conservation ==
Pseudopanax crassifolius is a non-threatened species, meaning it has large, stable populations. Mammalian browsing is a current threat to P. crassifolius. For example, brushtailed possum browsing is known to cause defoliation and death to mature trees. Cattle browsing also impacts the abundance of P. crassifolius, with one study finding the plant only in areas devoid of cattle.
