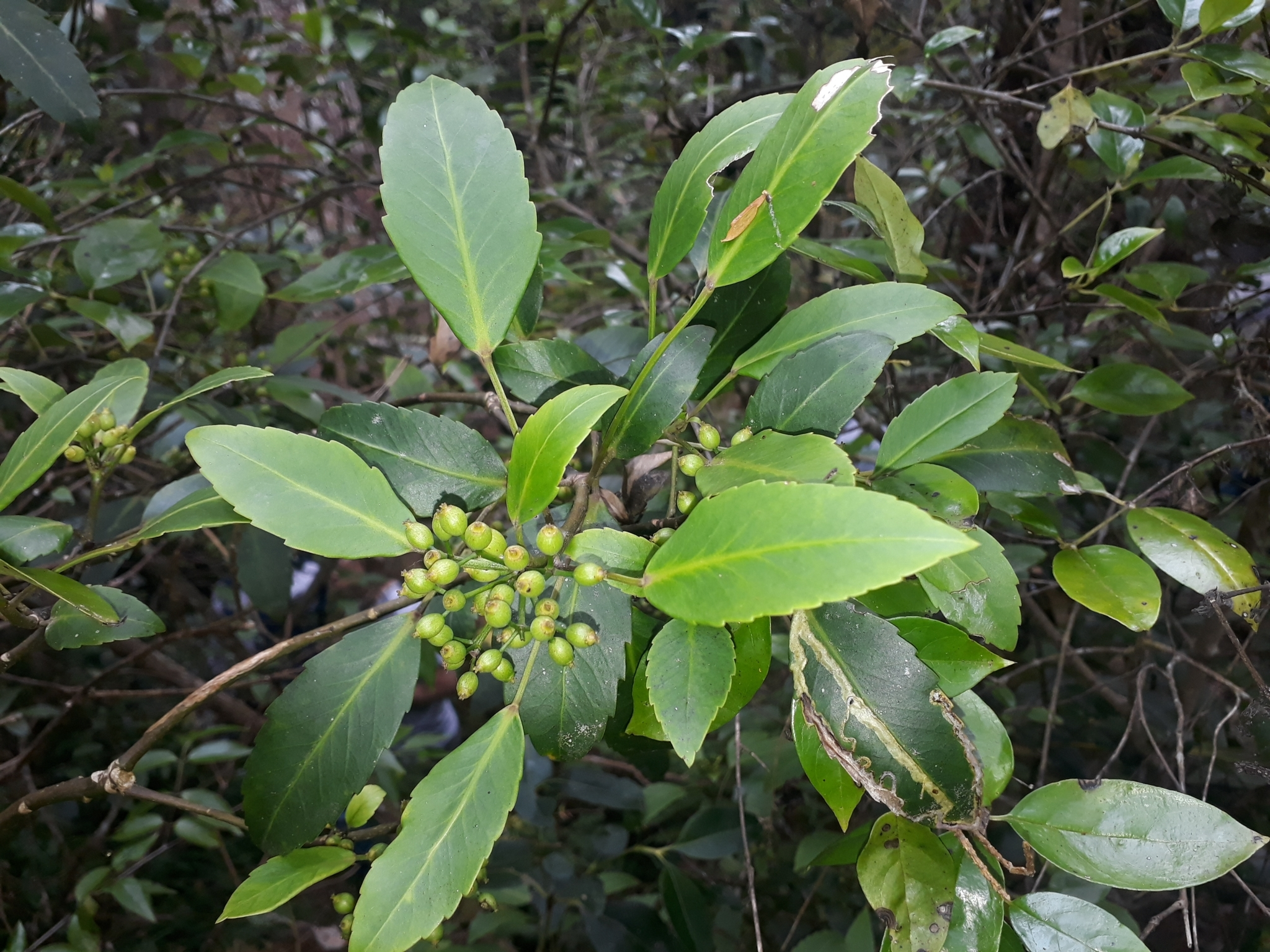
- In Northland, New Zealand

Conservation status
- Near Threatened (IUCN 2.3)

Scientific classification
- Kingdom: Plantae
- Clade: Tracheophytes
- Clade: Angiosperms
- Clade: Eudicots
- Clade: Asterids
- Order: Apiales
- Family: Araliaceae
- Genus: Pseudopanax
- Species: P. gilliesii

Binomial name
- Pseudopanax gilliesii Kirk

= Pseudopanax gilliesii =

Species of flowering plant

Pseudopanax gilliesii is a species of plant in the family Araliaceae. It is endemic, or native, to New Zealand. It is a small tree or shrub up to 5 metres tall occurring in lowland and coastal forest and probably restricted to the northeast of Northland.

== Description ==
This small much-branched tree has green branchlets usually ending in unifoliate or trifoliate leaf lobes. The alternate leaves are on petioles 2-8cm long, the petiole length varying by position on branch, and glossy green above and paler underneath. The leaves are 4-8cms long, sharply serrated with a prominent midvein. The inflorescence is a terminal umbel with green flowers, racemosly arranged. The dark purple fleshy fruit 6 by 5mm form 5 narrowly ovate seeds per fruit.

Compare the alternating whorls of unifoliate and trifoliate arranged leaves to the similar Pseudopanax discolour 5-foliolate, much thicker, finely serrated leaves. Also, the ranges of these species don't intersect.

== Conservation status ==
This species has be classified as At risk naturally uncommon under the New Zealand Threat Classification System.

== Gallery ==
Whole plant in forest

Terminal leaves and raceme

Front and back of leaves
