= Heterophyllous =

Having two different types of leaves

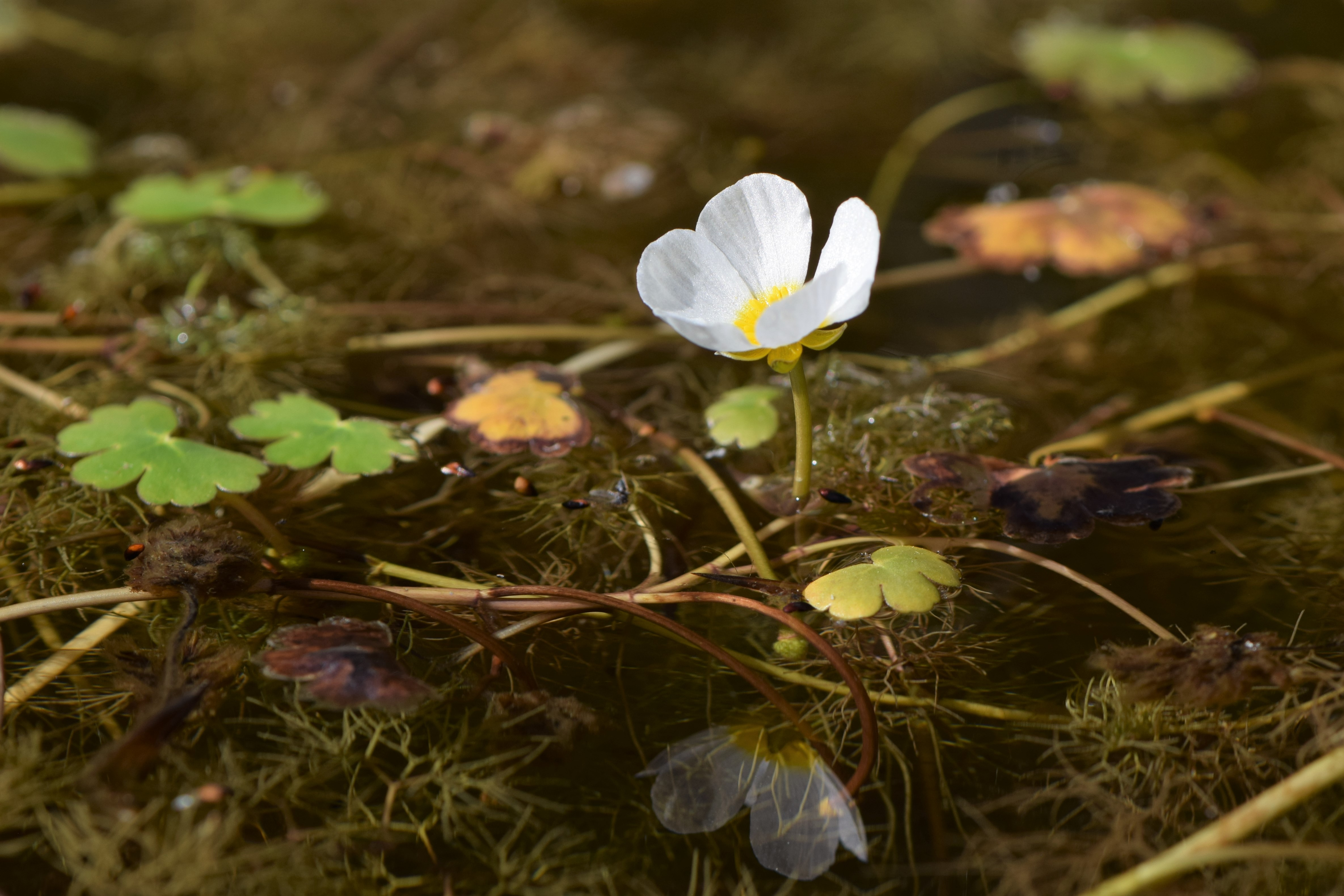
The two distinct leaf types of Ranunculus aquatilis, the common water-crowfoot, at and under the water surface.

Heterophylly is where a plant has at least two different types of leaves. The differences may be in shape or size of the leaves. A particularly dramatic example of a heterophyllous plant is Ranunculus aquatilis. It, like many aquatic plants, develops two very distinctive leaf types in response to the top of the plant being exposed to air. Underwater the leaves are very divided into thin strands while at or above the water surface it produces a wide, only partly divided, leaf blade.

The first use in English was in 1874 by Robert Brown in his A Manuel of Botany. There he defined it as, "variation in the external form of leaves". Heterophylly is a compound word "hetero-" from the Greek ἕτερος meaning different combined with "-phylly" from Greek φύλλον meaning leaf.

Heterophylly may be subdivided into different types, such as foliar dimorphism, heterophylly between different kinds of shoots, heteroblasty, and anisophylly.

In foliar dimorphism there are distinct juvenile and adult forms of leaves. An example of this are the adult and juvenile leaves of the Eucalyptus trees. The juvenile leaves are usually attached on opposite sides of a shoot directly to it while the adult leaves are attached alternately by short leaf stems.

A heterophyllous plant may have different kinds of leaves on different parts. For example in the redwood family, Cupressaceae, the leading shoots often have a different leaf type than those on side shoots.

Heteroblasty is where the leaves change in form or function along the length of a shoot, branch, or other part. This may be a gradual change along the length of a shoot or it may be an abrupt change such as from a scale like leaf to a photosynthetic one.

Plants may also be called heterophyllous if they have different leaves at different times, such as some of the carnivorous butterworts of genus Pinguicula which have differently adapted leaves for the summer and winter.
