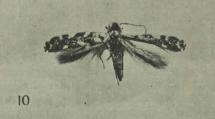

Scientific classification
- Kingdom: Animalia
- Phylum: Arthropoda
- Clade: Pancrustacea
- Class: Insecta
- Order: Lepidoptera
- Family: Gracillariidae
- Genus: Acrocercops
- Species: A. panacivagans

Binomial name
- Acrocercops panacivagans (Watt, 1920)

Synonyms
- Parectopa panacivagans Watt, 1920; Eumetriochroa panacivagans (Watt, 1920)

= Acrocercops panacivagans =

Species of moth

Acrocercops panacivagans or Eumetriochroa panacivagans is a moth of the family Gracillariidae. It is endemic to New Zealand. In 2019 Robert Hoare and colleagues proposed that this species be provisionally assigned to the genus Eumetriochroa.

Mine

The wingspan is about 8 mm.

The larvae feed on Pseudopanax crassifolius. They mine the leaves of their host plant. The mine is a simple gallery, more or less straight in its direction. It is made entirely in the upper surface of the leaf. The mine starts in a more or less oblique direction till it reaches the midrib or margin of the leaf. It follows the margin till it reaches the end of the leaf, and it then either turns back alongside its former track or continues back along the barrier on the other half of the leaf. It never crosses the midrib except in its upper part. On the margin of the leaf the mine closely follows all the irregularities of the outline, and extends into the bases of the serrations of the leaf. Portions of the earlier mine may be enveloped by the later broader gallery. The colour of the mine is light green in fresh mines. Margins of the mine are fairly regular and white. The frass is almost fluid in nature, and occupies a fairly broad brown band in the centre of the early gallery, but in the wider part is dark green or black, and often forms an unbroken line on one side of the gallery. It is sometimes deposited in short curved transverse lines with the concavity directed forwards. It appears to be deposited chiefly on the upper cuticle of the leaf.
