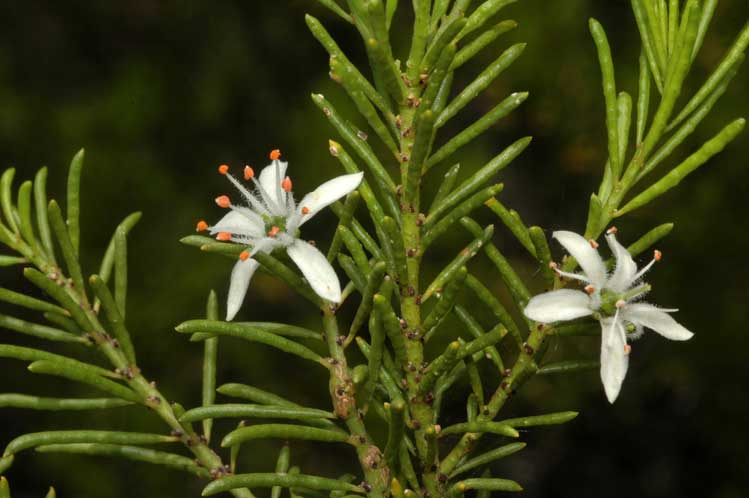
- In Gundabooka National Park

Scientific classification
- Kingdom: Plantae
- Clade: Embryophytes
- Clade: Tracheophytes
- Clade: Spermatophytes
- Clade: Angiosperms
- Clade: Eudicots
- Clade: Rosids
- Order: Sapindales
- Family: Rutaceae
- Genus: Philotheca
- Species: P. linearis

Binomial name
- Philotheca linearis (Cunn. ex. Endl.) Paul G.Wilson

Synonyms
- Eriostemon halmaturorum F.Muell.; Eriostemon lineare A.Cunn. ex Endl. orth. var.; Eriostemon linearis A.Cunn. ex Endl.

= Philotheca linearis =

Rock wallaby shrub

Species of plant

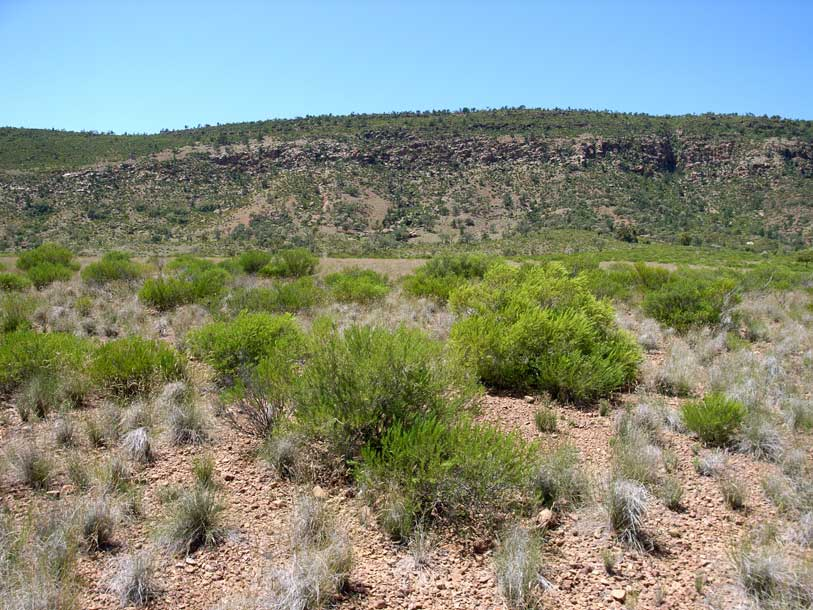
Habit in Gundabooka National Park

Philotheca linearis, commonly known as the rock wallaby shrub or narrow-leaf wax-flower, is a species of flowering plant in the family Rutaceae and is endemic to an inland areas of southern Australia. It is a shrub with glandular-warty branchlets and leaves, club-shaped to cylindrical leaves and white flowers arranged singly in leaf axils.

== Description ==
Philotheca linearis is a shrub that grows to a height of 0.5–2 m (1 ft 8 in – 6 ft 7 in) with warty glands on the branchlets. The leaves are also glandular-warty, club-shaped to cylindrical, 8–20 mm (0.31–0.79 in) long and channelled on the upper surface. The flowers are borne singly in leaf axils, each flower on a pedicel 4–6 mm (0.16–0.24 in) long. There are five broadly egg-shaped sepals about 1 mm (0.039 in) long and five elliptical white petals 4–6 mm (0.16–0.24 in) long. The ten stamens are free from each other and hairy. Flowering mainly occurs in spring and the fruit is about 5 mm (0.20 in) long and prominently beaked.

== Taxonomy ==
This philotheca was first formally described in 1837 by Stephan Endlicher from an unpublished description by Allan Cunningham who gave it the name Eriostemon linearis. Endlicher published the description in the Enumeratio plantarum quas in Novae Hollandiae ora austro-occidentali ad fluvium Cygnorum et in sinu Regis Georgii collegit Carolus Liber Baro de Hügel. The type specimens were collected by Cunningham on the "Barren Ranges on the Lachlan River" in June 1817. In 1998, Wilson changed the name to Philotheca linearis in the journal Nuysia.

== Distribution and habitat ==
Philotheca linearis on and around rock outcrops from the Great Victoria Desert in Western Australia and east to the Everard, Gawler and Flinders Ranges in South Australia and the Cobar – Bourke – Broken Hill area of New South Wales.

== Conservation status ==
In Western Australia, P. linearis is classified as "Priority One" by the Government of Western Australia Department of Parks and Wildlife, meaning that it is known from only one or a few locations which are potentially at risk.
