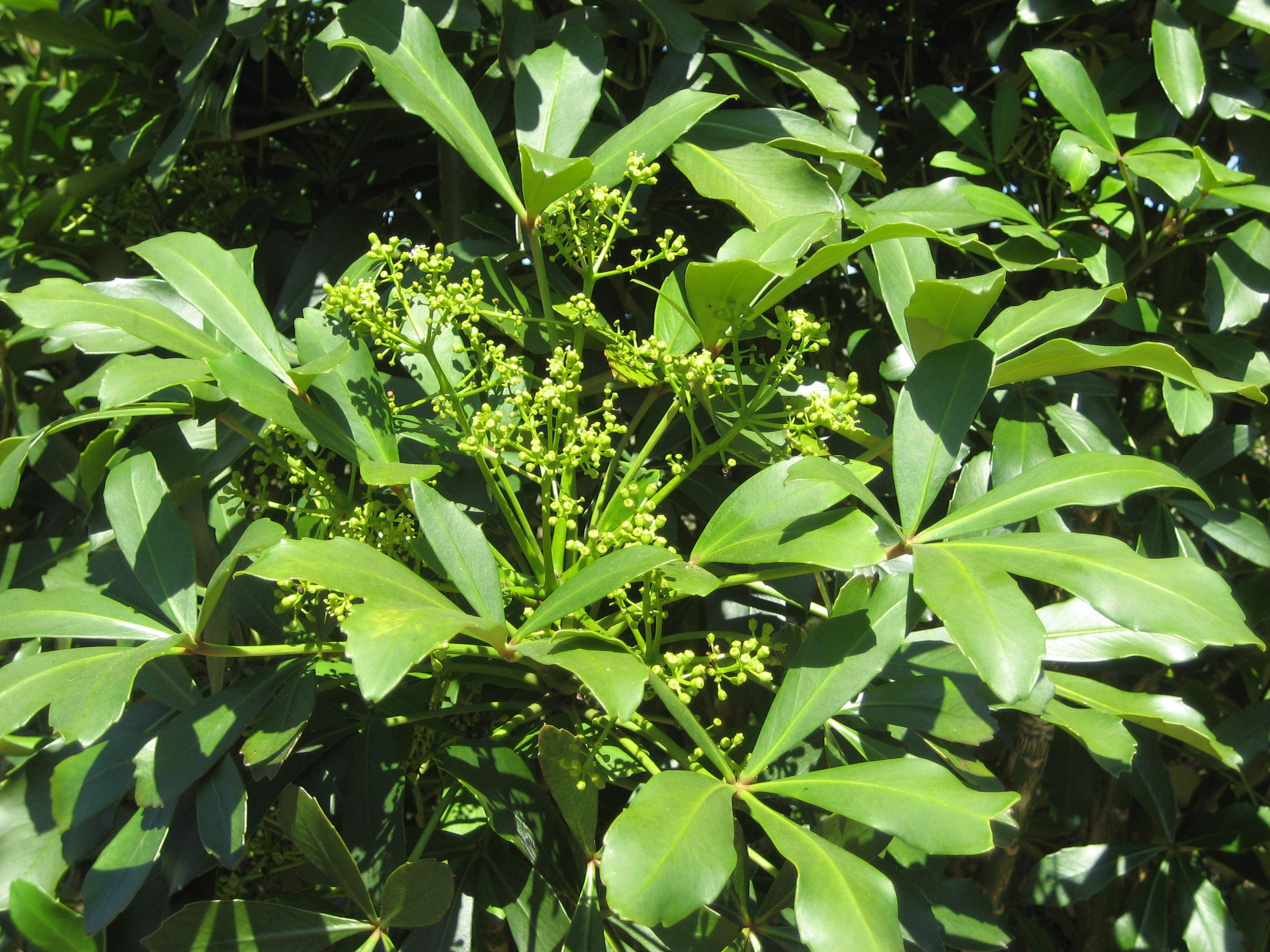
- Pseudopanax lessonii

Scientific classification
- Kingdom: Plantae
- Clade: Tracheophytes
- Clade: Angiosperms
- Clade: Eudicots
- Clade: Asterids
- Order: Apiales
- Family: Araliaceae
- Subfamily: Aralioideae
- Genus: Pseudopanax; K.Koch

Species
- Pseudopanax chathamicus Kirk; Pseudopanax crassifolius (Sol. ex A.Cunn.) K.Koch; Pseudopanax discolor (Kirk) Harms; Pseudopanax ferox Kirk; Pseudopanax gilliesii Kirk; Pseudopanax lessonii (DC.) K.Koch; Pseudopanax linearis (Hook.f.) auct.

= Pseudopanax =

Genus of plants

Pseudopanax (Latin for "false ginseng") is a genus of seven species of evergreen plants that are endemic to New Zealand. Flowers of the genus occur in terminal umbels.

== Taxonomy ==
A 2000 molecular study established that several species within the genus were only distantly related to the core group of New Zealand species related the type species P. crassifolius. They were removed to the genus Raukaua.

== Distribution and habitat ==
Pseudopanax occur in forest or scrub environments. The genus contains some remarkable small trees with distinctly different juvenile and adult forms, such as Pseudopanax crassifolius (lancewood) and Pseudopanax ferox (toothed lancewood).

== Cultivation ==
Many of the species are popular in New Zealand gardens, but are rather rare in cultivation elsewhere, requiring mild, moist conditions similar to those in New Zealand, without extremes of temperature in winter and summer. They reportedly grow well in Southern California and warmer parts of Great Britain. A number of cultivars have been developed, mostly of Pseudopanax lessonii. These include 'Gold Splash', which has yellow variegated leaves, and 'Nigra' which has dark purple-brown foliage. A National Trust listed specimen of Pseudopanax crassifolius exists on the Alton property at Mount Macedon, Victoria, Australia, which is 21 metres high and has an 11.5 m spread. Its age is estimated at 100 years.

== Host plant ==
In New Zealand various species in this genus are the host plant for the larvae of Scolopterus penicillatus, a common endemic weevil. The larvae develop in recently dead bark.

== See also ==
- Neopanax – either a closely related genus or a clade within Pseudopanax
