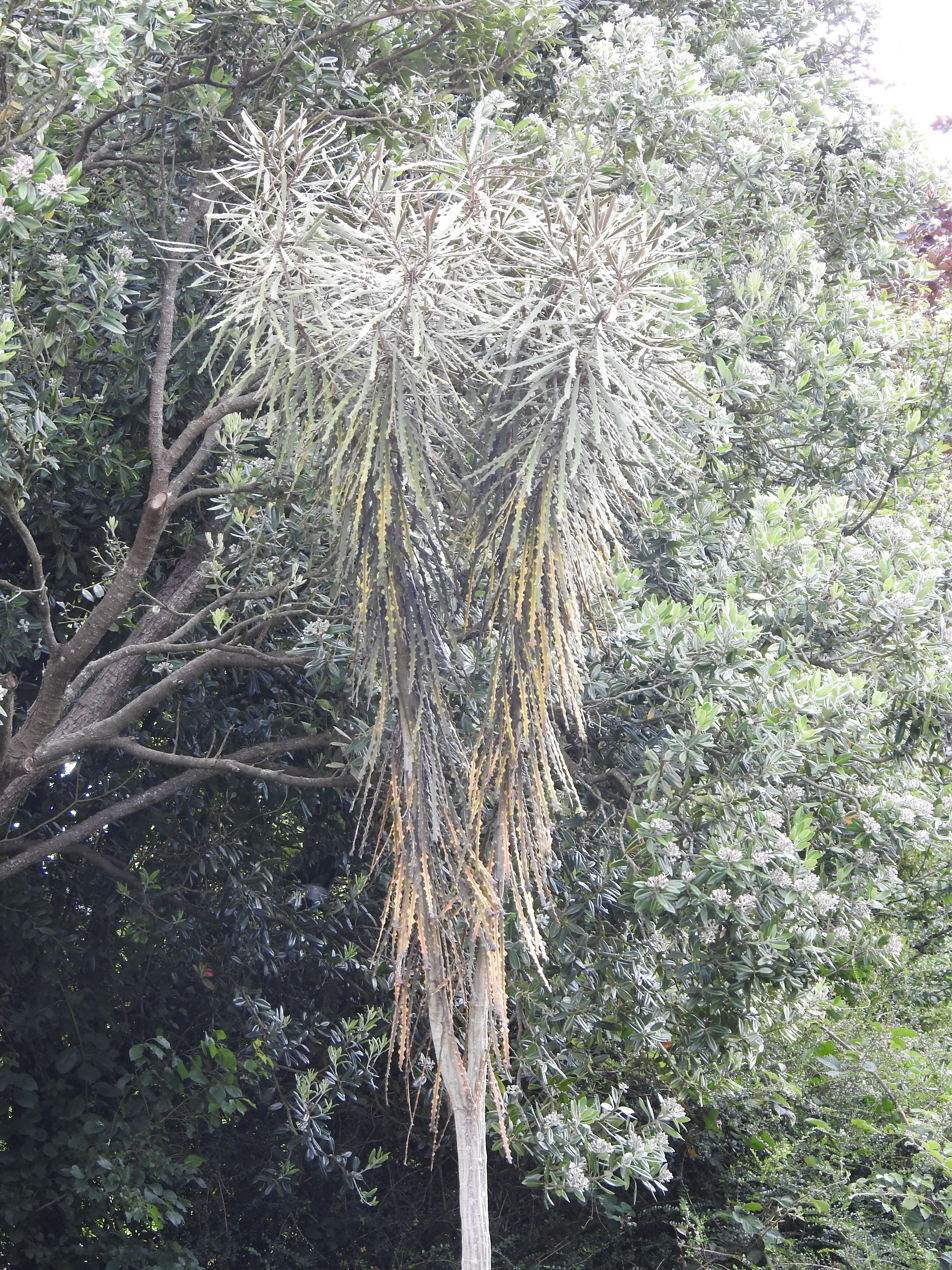
- 'Adolescent' toothed lancewood (P. ferox) with a mixture of adult and juvenile leaves.

Conservation status
- Near Threatened (IUCN 2.3)

- Naturally Uncommon (NZ TCS)

Scientific classification
- Kingdom: Plantae
- Clade: Tracheophytes
- Clade: Angiosperms
- Clade: Eudicots
- Clade: Asterids
- Order: Apiales
- Family: Araliaceae
- Genus: Pseudopanax
- Species: P. ferox

Binomial name
- Pseudopanax ferox Kirk

= Pseudopanax ferox =

Species of tree endemic to New Zealand

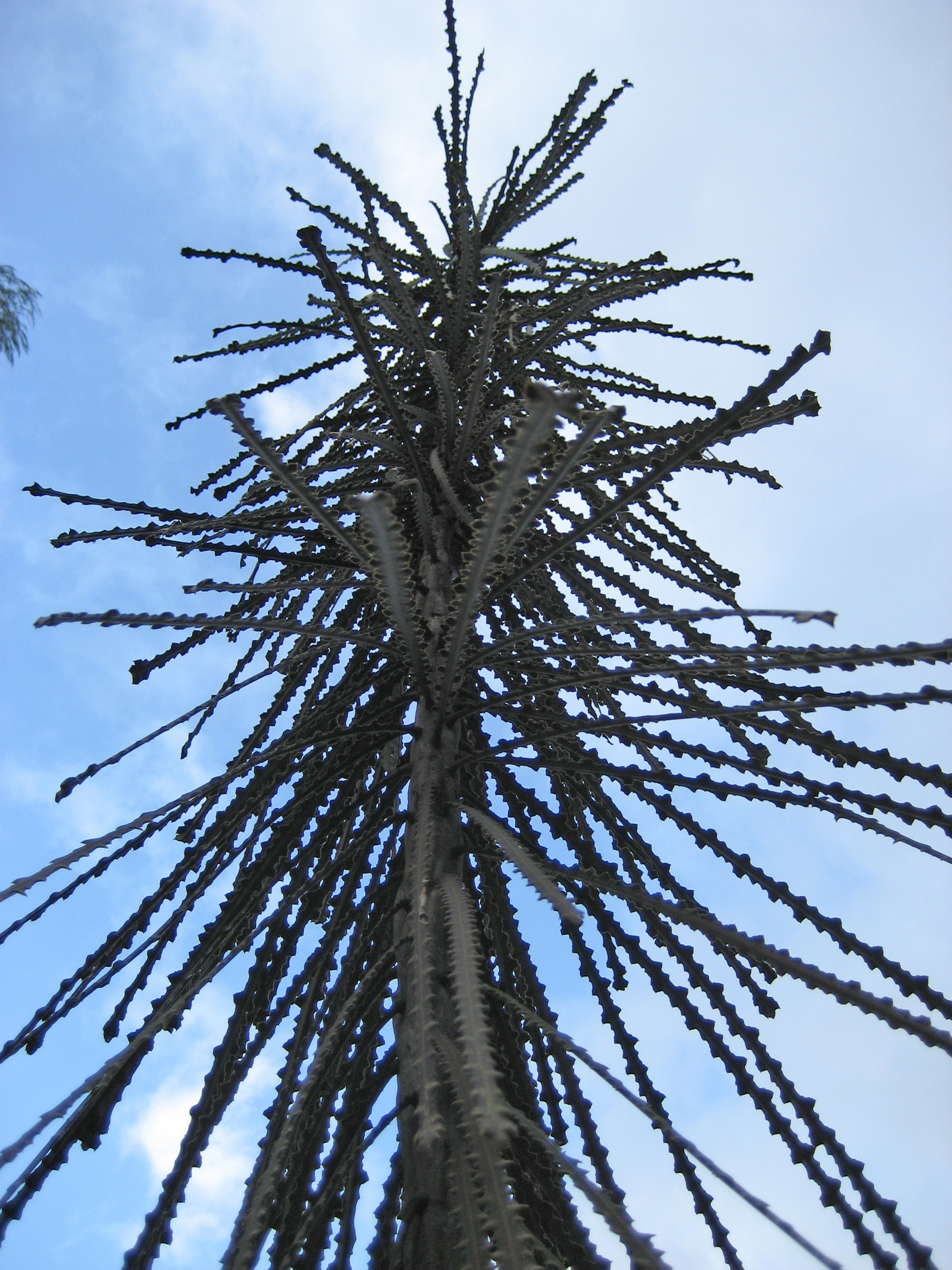
Juvenile Pseudopanax ferox tree

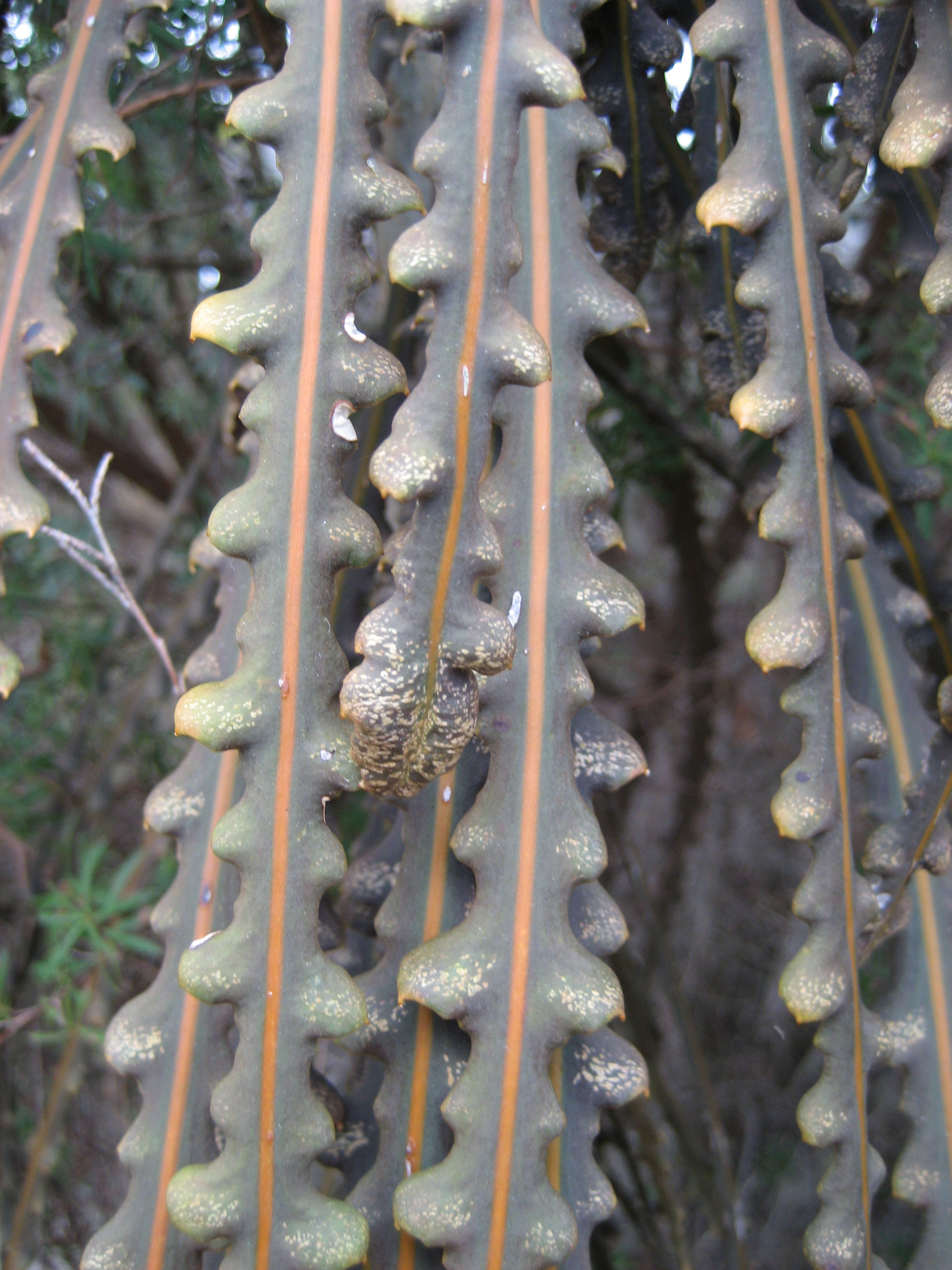
Detail of juvenile leaves

Pseudopanax ferox, commonly known as toothed lancewood or horoeka, is a small heteroblastic tree which belongs to the family Araliaceae. It is endemic to New Zealand, and is similar to the more common lancewood, Pseudopanax crassifolius, but with more prominently tooth-shaped leaves. The tree is sometimes called fierce lancewood, in reference to its fierce-looking saw-tooth shaped juvenile leaves.

== Description ==
Pseudopanax ferox is a small heteroblastic plant, similar to P. crassifolius. This means the leaf patterns and growth habits are different depending on its stage of growth.

A mature toothed lancewood can reach 6 metres height with a trunk of up to 25 cm in diameter. It is only in adulthood that the tree's shape changes from one central stem and downward growing leaves to a more typical tree shape with branches spreading to build a round head.

=== Leaves ===
Seedling leaves of P. Ferox range from colors such as dark to light chocolate brown or almost black.

The juvenile leaves are a very dark grey-brown to grey-green colour, narrow, stiff and up to 40 cm long (15.7 in), by 0.6–1.5cm (0.23–0.6 in) wide. Leaves are also margined with teeth reminiscent of a chainsaw blade, with rounded or serrate lobes. Their grey-green color has a metallic sheen with a prominent reddish midrib. The leaves are all angled downwards, usually about 45º from the trunk.

Once the slow growing tree reaches maturity at 10 to 15 years, the leaf form becomes shorter, wider and dark green in colour. The adult leaves are shorter and wider at 5–15cm (1.97–5.9 in) by 1–2cm (0.4–0.79 in). The adult leaves will have less serrated margins, or even no serration at all.

=== Trunk ===
The trunk is slender when juvenile, and develops a more braided and grooved pattern at maturity.

For adult trees, the trunk can get up to 25cm in diameter, and develop distinct longitudinal grooves that twist slightly, going along the length of the trunk. The bark is smooth and mottled grey, with the scars of old leaves prominent.

=== Flowers ===
The small and inconspicuous flowers are clustered in terminal compound umbels, with 5–12 rays each 3–5 cm (1.18–1.97 in) long. The flowers, similar to those of P. crassifolius, are also bisexual, and have roughly 4–5 stamens and 5 styles.

=== Fruit ===
Compared to P. crassifolius, the fleshy and ovoid fruits of P. ferox are slightly larger in diameter at 8–9 mm (0.31–0.35 in). Fruits also appear to be brown or purple-brown when ripe. Similar to P. crassifolius, the fruits of P. ferox contain about five locules, with one seed per locule.

== Taxonomy ==
The currently accepted name of the species was first described in 1889, by English botanist Thomas Kirk. It was originally referred to as Panax ferox Kirk in 1878, before being transferred to the Pseudopanax genus due to morphological distinctions separating New Zealand Araliaceous plants from the plants that were species of the primarily Asian genus Panax.

== Etymology ==
The species epithet ferox derives from Latin for 'fierce' or 'wild', which usually refers to very spiny plants, and alludes to the formidable appearance of P. ferox as a result of its toothed juvenile leaves.

== Distribution ==
It has a patchy distribution in the North Island. It is more widespread in the South Island, mainly east of the Main Divide, from the Marlborough Sounds to Southland. Current native populations are scarce and consist of small, isolated groups, mainly due to historical habitat loss.

== Habitat ==
Pseudopanax ferox thrives in coastal to subalpine areas between 10–800 m (30–2,620 ft) above sea level, favoring areas such as sand dunes, grey scrub, alluvial gravels and cliffs. This species typically prefers drier habitats and conditions compared to Pseudopanax crassifolius.

== Ecology ==
=== Phenology and reproduction ===
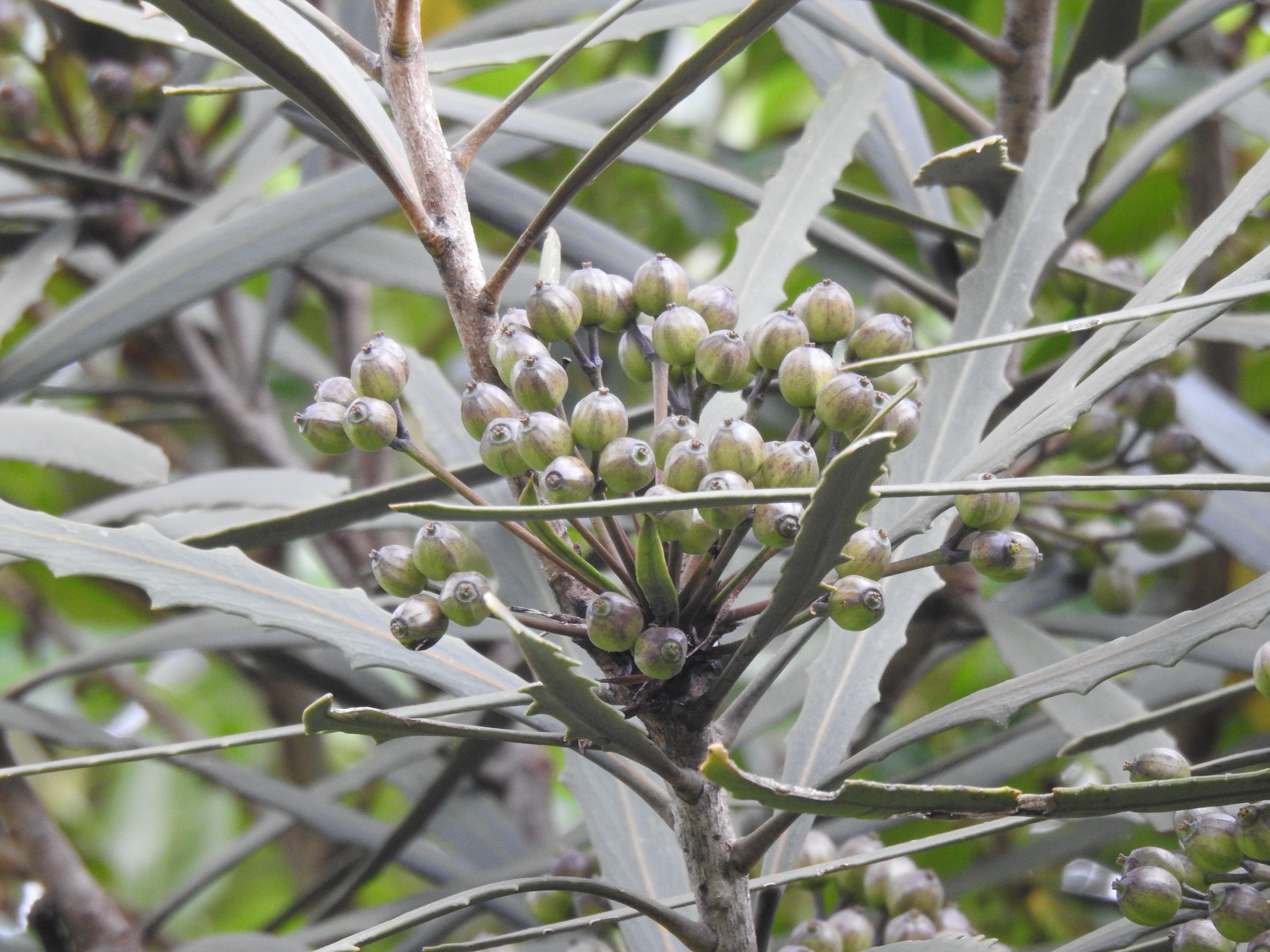
Fruits of Pseudopanax ferox

The juvenile phase of P. ferox, persists for 15–20 years, when the tree reaches its adult form, the plant forms a slender, unbranched trunk up to several meters tall. Maturity is reached around 20–30 years, when branching begins and leaves transition to shorter, broader adult forms, enabling flower and fruit production.

Fruits develop slowly over approximately one year, maturing from autumn through winter into spring, and are primarily dispersed by New Zealand native birds such as the tūī and kererū, which consume them and remove the inhibitory flesh via digestion.

Seeds within the fruits have relatively low germination rates in controlled conditions, achieving around 18–20% for cleaned seeds under standard temperatures, though rates can be reduced by residual fruit flesh.

=== Lifespan ===
Lifespan typically ranges from 50 to over 100 years, as with all other species of Pseudopanax.

== Use ==
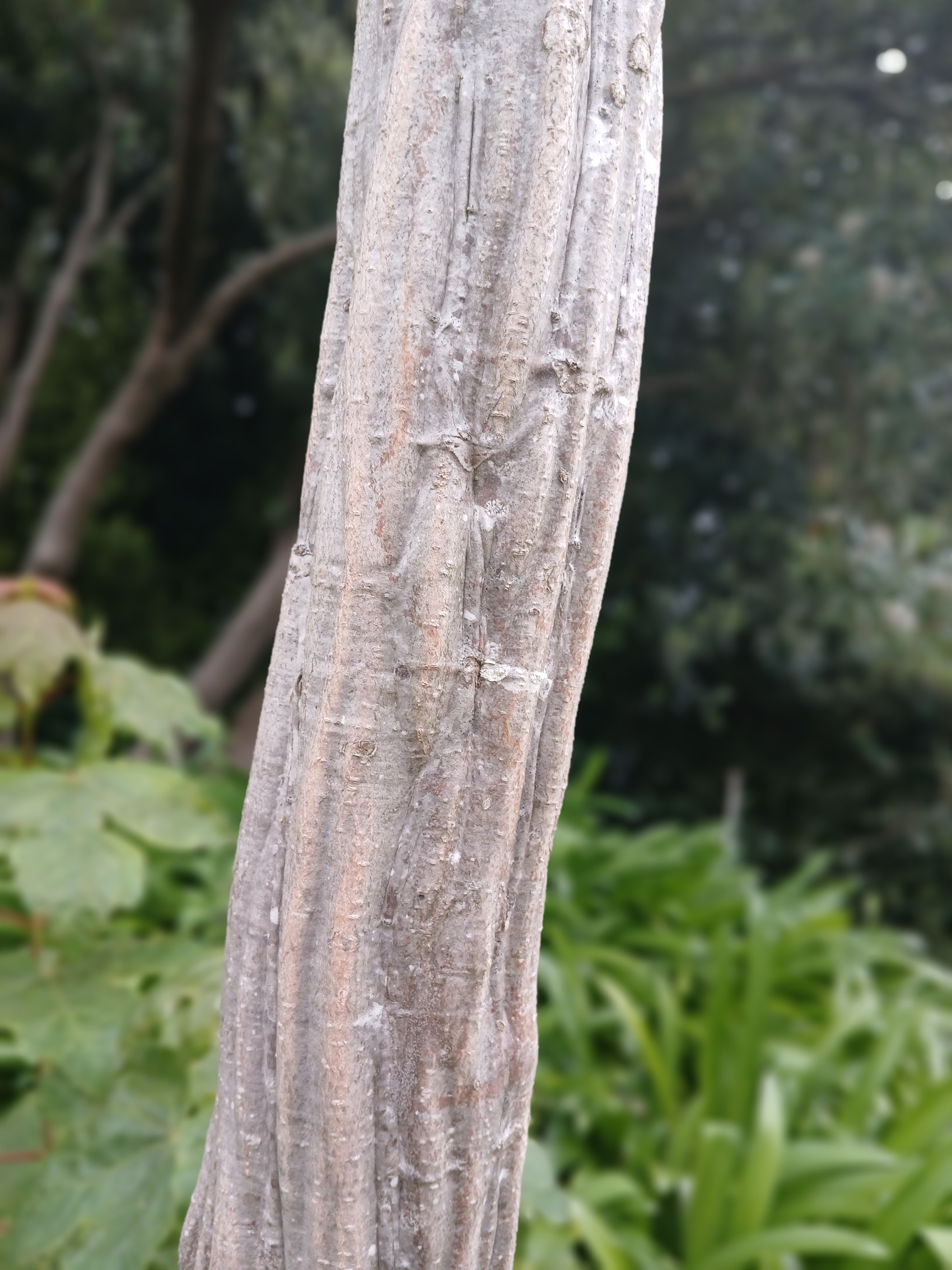
The trunk of an adult Pseudopanax ferox

=== Cultivation and urban design ===
Toothed lancewood used to be rare in cultivation, but is now a favored gardening plant in New Zealand. It gained wide popularity following its use in the gold-medal winning New Zealand exhibit at the 2004 Chelsea Flower Show in the United Kingdom. The distinctive leaves and juvenile shape lend themselves to use in narrow spaces and are often used to complement modern building architecture. Due to its slow growth and relatively small size for a tree – even once mature – it is one of few trees innately suitable for small gardens.

=== Planting ===
Planting is best done in free draining soil in any semi-shaded to sunny position. Leaves are more numerous in sunny situations, which is noticeable on young specimens. Toothed lancewood is generally hardy and can withstand some minor frost damage to the tip (which may cause it to branch). It is also tolerant of dry locations and high winds.

== Conservation ==
As of 2023, P. ferox is listed in the New Zealand Threat Classification as naturally uncommon. This means it has a naturally small population size. Mammalian browsing is also a threat to P. ferox, where it gets browsed by possums, deers and goats.

== Literary references ==
Lancewood, a 1999 war novel by New Zealand author Alan Marshall, references this plant as a metaphor for the taking up of arms to protect New Zealand during World War II. There are many long passages reflecting upon the form of the lancewood, for example: "A bizarre jagged gem of the forest with leaves lancing out at all angles; each blade a blade -- deeply serrated to create a satanic botanic sword".
