= Heteroblasty =

Difference in plant characteristics in juveniles compared to adults

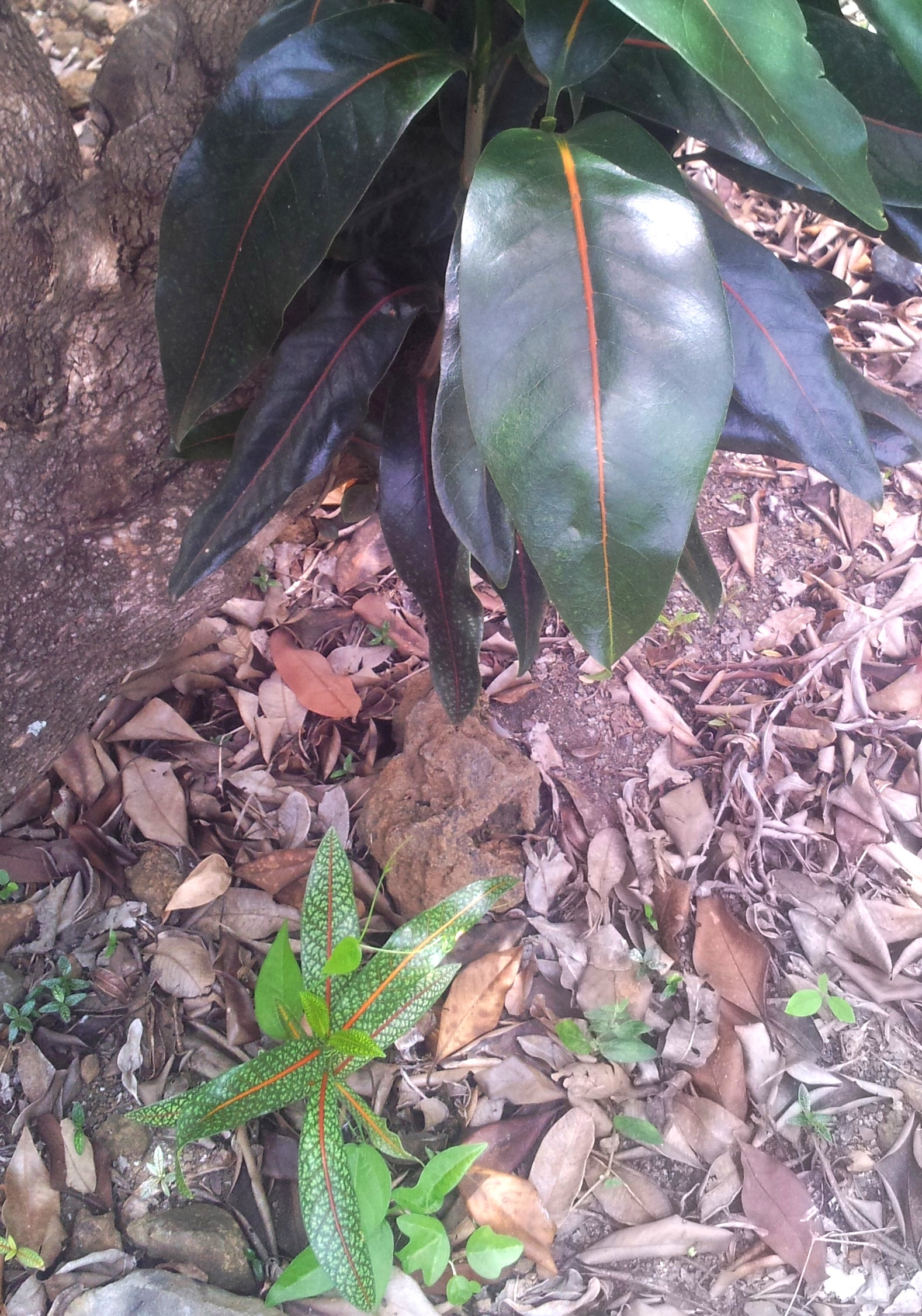
Heteroblasty in a Mauritian species of plant, Tarenna borbonica

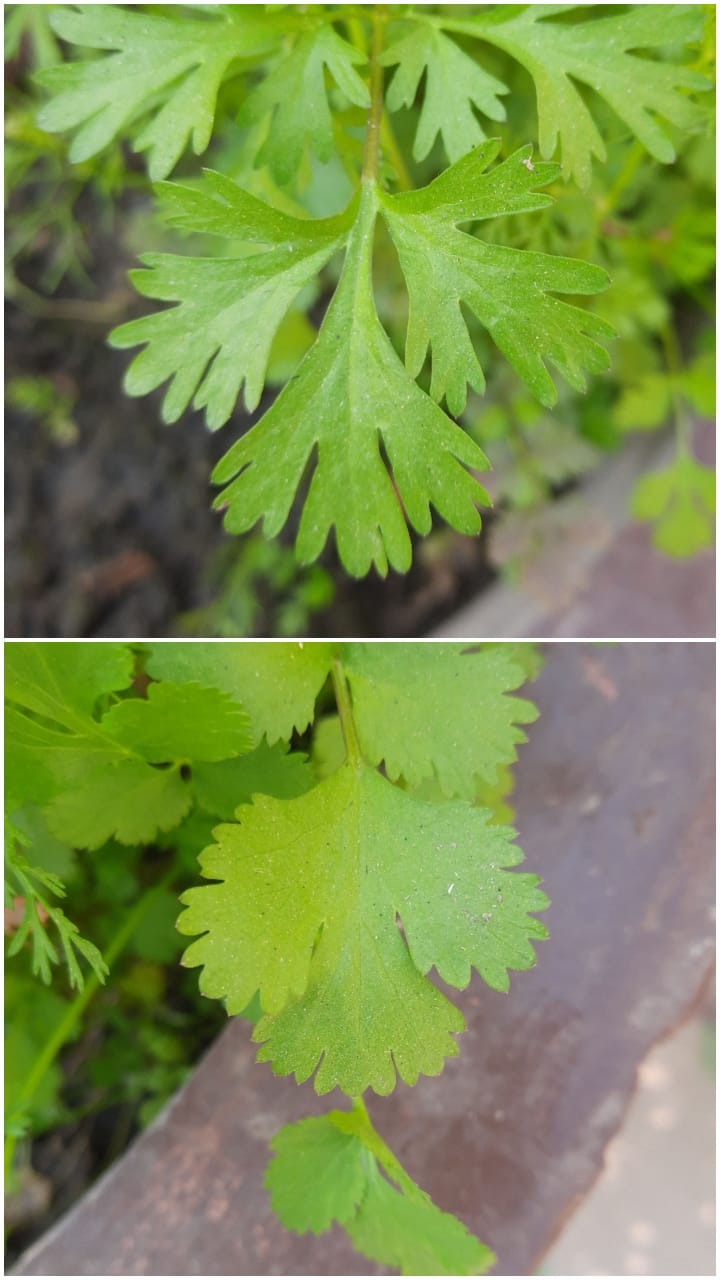
Heterophylly in Coriandrum sativum.

Heteroblasty is the significant and abrupt change in form and function, that occurs over the lifespan of certain plants. Characteristics affected include internode length and stem structure as well as leaf form, size and arrangement. It should not be confused with seasonal heterophylly, where early and late growth in a season are visibly different. This change is different from a homoblastic change which is a gradual change or little change at all, so that there is little difference between the juvenile and adult stages. Heteroblasty is found in many plant families as well as only some species within a genus. This random spread of heteroblastic plants across species is believed to be caused by convergent evolution.

The earlier and later stages of development are commonly labeled as juvenile and adult respectively, particularly in relation to leaves. Heteroblastic change is thus often referred to as 'vegetative phase change' (distinct from reproductive phase change) in the plant molecular biology literature.

The term heteroblasty was coined by the German botanist Karl Ritter von Goebel, along with homoblasty for plants with leaf characteristics that do not change significantly. Leonard Cockayne observed that heteroblasty occurred in an unusually high proportion of tree species native to New Zealand.

== Origins ==
There are two ways to look at how heteroblasty developed. The first is to look at the evolution of heteroblasty, and the second is to consider the ecological interactions of heteroblastic plants.

=== Evolution ===
Many hypothesize that heteroblasty is a result of natural selection for species, that can best survive in both low and high light environments. As a plant grows in the forest it experiences predictable changes in light intensity. With this in mind a plant that changes its leaf morphology and phyllotaxy to best suit these changes in light intensity could be more competitive than one that has only on leaf form and phyllotaxy. It is also hypothesized that the development of heteroblastic trees preceded the development of divaricating shrub forms, which are now very common in New Zealand. It is thought that these shrubs are a mutation from the heteroblastic trees and have lost the ability to develop into the adult stage and so are very similar to heteroblastic trees in their juvenile form. It has also been observed that heteroblastic species do not stem from a single point of origin they are found in many different and unrelated species, because of this it is believed that large-scale convergent evolution has to have occurred for so many unrelated plants to exhibit similar behavior.

=== Ecology ===
Heteroblasty can affect all parts of the plant but the leaves are the most common examples and by far the most studied. It has been hypothesized that the heteroblastic changes are due to changes in the plant's exposure to sun, because many species spend their juvenile years in the understory then grow to maturity where they are a part of the top canopy and so have full exposure to the sun. This has not been well studied, because the common heteroblastic plants are woody and take so long to grow such as Eucalyptus grandis. The juvenile plants tend to face more competition and must make special adaptations to succeed that are then unnecessary as a mature plant. For example, a sampling in a dense forest must grow quickly to succeed at first but once it has established itself most woody plants no longer compete severely with their neighbor and so the adaptations needed as a juvenile plant are no longer necessary. This can lead to a change in growth in maturity as the tree faces new environmental factors. Such as a need to resist new pathogens or parasites.

== Mechanism ==
At the cellular level, there are different ways that a plant controls its growth and development. There are internal and external signals that result in a change in the plant's response. The plants also have genetic predetermined growth patterns.

=== Signaling ===
Hormones are known to regulate heteroblastic change in plants. One hormone that has been identified is gibberellin. In a study, it was used to spontaneously revert the mature form of Hedera helix (a common English ivy) to its juvenile form. After being sprayed with gibberellin acid some of the ivies began to produce aerial roots which are a characteristic of the juvenile form as well as three lobed leaves another characteristic. It is also hypothesized that auxin and cytokinin when working together can cause the sudden change in phyllotaxy of heterogenetic plants. The gene ABPH1 has been found to code for cytokinin and when changed in a mutant affected the plant's ability to regulate the phyllotaxy of the stem. The hypothesis is based mostly on studies done on non-heteroblastic plants and so it is not certain that these are the cause of the sudden changes in a heteroblastic plant. A dramatic change in leaf size is another example of a heteroblastic change in plants and researchers have looked to studies done on non-heteroblastic plants for answers about what hormones and genes could regulate these changes. Aintegumenta has been found to be one of these regulatory genes that regulated cell growth. It is believed that many genes are involved in the regulation of leaf size and these genes do not closely interact meaning they are not caused by a master regulator but instead are a part of many different pathways.

=== Genetics ===
Some most common model plants include Arabidopsis thaliana (common name: mouse-ear cress), Antirrhinum majus (common name: snapdragon), and Zea mays (common name: corn). Some authors have argued that these species are not useful models for the study of gene expression in heteroblastic plants because none of them express obvious heteroblastic traits. Researchers in this area of study can use Arabidopsis to some degree for study as it does undergo some change from the juvenile phase to the mature phase but it is not clearly heteroblastic. If we assume the process of change is similar and uses similar regulations we can use Arabidopsis to analyze the causes of change in plant growth that may be occurring in the same way but more dramatically in heteroblastic plants and so can only be used to analyze heteroblastic changes. This involves many assumptions though and so researchers are seeking other plants to use as model subjects. The problem with this is that most plants that display heteroblastic growth are woody plants. Their life spans are much longer in general and unlike Arabidopsis very little of their genomes are known or mapped. A species that shows promise is Eucalyptus grandis. This tree is grown commonly because of its many uses for teas, oils, and wood. The tree overall is fast growing and widely grown due to its many uses and so is one of the best candidates for genome sequencing, which is being done now so that the tree can be better studied in the future. There is already a complete quantitative trait loci map for the juvenile traits.

== Examples ==
These plants are a few of the common examples of heteroblastic plants often found in studies and is far from an all-encompassing list. All listed are plants, because they are the only organisms that have been found to undergo this growth change it is absent in animals, fungi, and microbes as far as is known to this point.

1. Lightwood (Acacia implexa) is a fast wood tree found in Australia
2. Spiral ginger (Costus pulverulentus C.Presl) is an herb found in South America found primarily in Nicaragua and is used as a traditional medicine in teas for pain and inflammation. It is also used to treat cancer.
3. Lancewood (Pseudopanax crassifolius) is a native of New Zealand
4. Pokaka (Elaeocarpus hookerianus) native to New Zealand
5. Bucket-of-water tree or marbleleaf (Carpodetus serratus) native to New Zealand

== Geographic distribution ==
This is a list of places heteroblastic plants have been commonly found and documented but not a complete list of all places as heteroblastic plants can be hard to identify and do not appear in families predictably.

- New Zealand has a very large population of heteroblastic plants with about 200 tree species and 10% of the woody shrubs species having heteroblastic tendencies.
- Australia also has heteroblastic species though the exact amount is not known.
- South America also has a few heteroblastic plants, specifically known in Mexico, and Nicaragua.

== Similar processes ==
Processes often confused with heteroblasty include:

1. Homoblasty is the first example of this. To understand heteroblasty you must first understand that homoblasty is different. Homoblastic change is the slight change a plant experiences over a long period of time as it grows to maturity. Examples of this are a plants leaves growing slightly larger over time as it matures or a trees trunk growing in girth.
2. Heterophylly is another term that is often used interchangeably with heteroblasty. The process of heterophylly refers to specific changes in leaf morphology that lead to variation in leaf shape or size on a single plant. This type of change is seen when you study the individual leaves and compare them, this is different than heteroblasty in which the entire foliage changes dramatically but for the most part uniformly. A heteroblastic plant can have heterophyllic changes but they are not the same.
3. Phenotypic plasticity changes the structure of plants as well but should not be confused with heteroblasty. Phenotypic plasticity is when an individual can use the same genes to create a different phenotype based on environmental signals. Such as when a plant is adapting its immune system to a new pathogen or when a reptile changes its sex based on environmental queues. The difference here is that heteroblasty is not entirely dependent on the environment, though it can be affected by it, and happens throughout the plant's maturity instead of at random points because of an environmental change.

== See also ==
- Lammas growth, a second burst of growth late in the growing season exhibited by some trees, often different in appearance from spring growth
