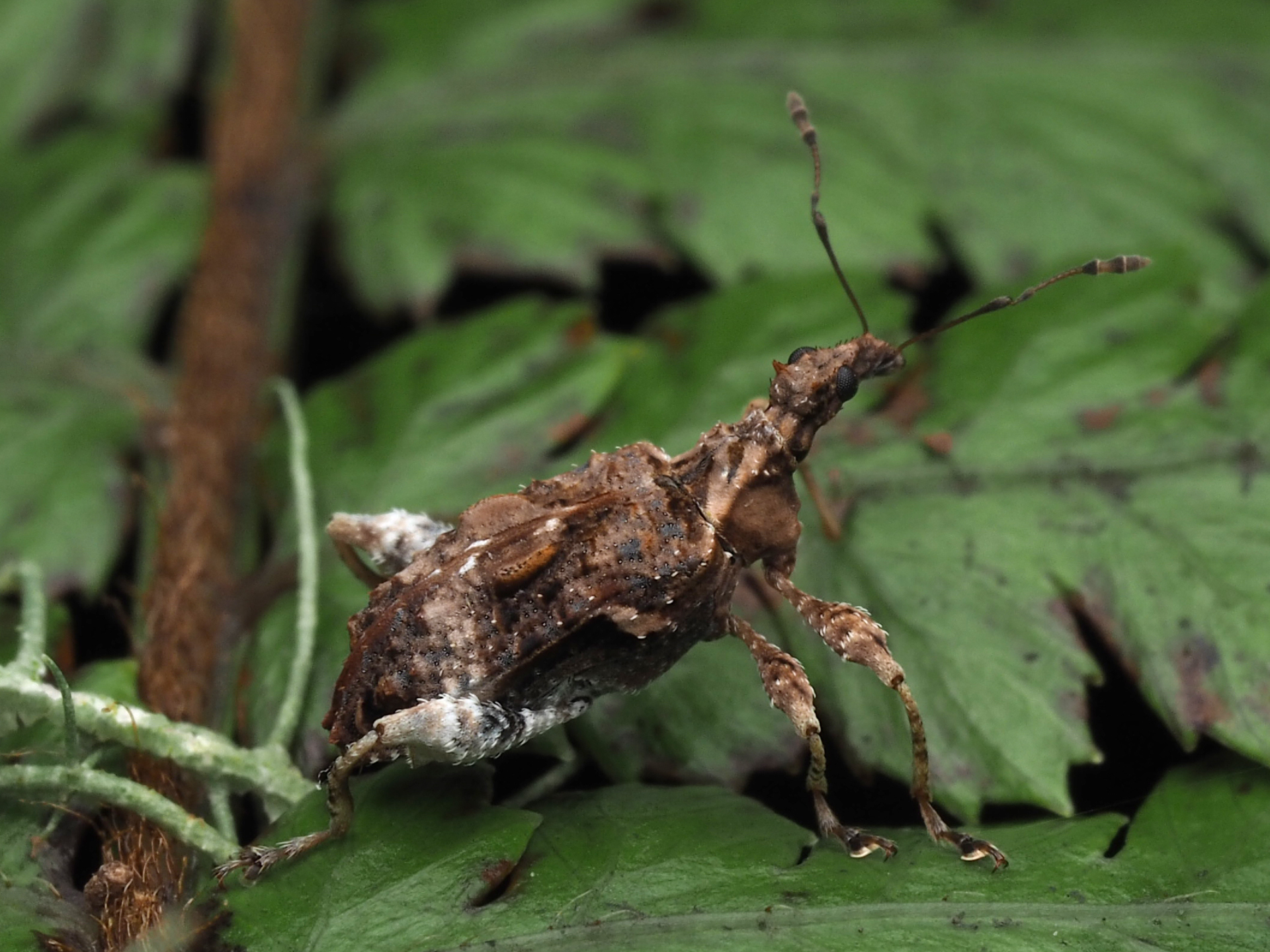
- Stephanorhynchus curvipes

Scientific classification
- Kingdom: Animalia
- Phylum: Arthropoda
- Class: Insecta
- Order: Coleoptera
- Suborder: Polyphaga
- Infraorder: Cucujiformia
- Family: Curculionidae
- Subfamily: Curculioninae
- Tribe: Eugnomini
- Subtribe: Eugnomina
- Genus: Stephanorhynchus; White, 1846

Type species
- Stephanorhynchus curvipes White, 1846

Species
- Stephanorhynchus aper Sharp, 1886; Stephanorhynchus attelaboides (Fabricius, 1775); Stephanorhynchus curvipes White, 1846; Stephanorhynchus tuberosus Broun, 1881

= Stephanorhynchus =

Genus of New Zealand weevils

Stephanorhynchus is a genus of flower weevils endemic to New Zealand. It was first described in 1846, revised in 2024, and currently contains four species, which are generally grey-brown in colour. The most common species is S. curvipes.

== Distribution ==
Stephanorhynchus species are all found in New Zealand, where they are found on the North and South islands, with one species present in the Chathams. S. curvipes is the most widespread and commonly encountered species.

== Description ==
Stephanorhynchus can be identified from its most similar relatives, genus Callistomorphus, by the rostrum, which is relatively short (though still longer than the head, unlike Moanus) and has a ridge on the top side, and the pronotum, the front edge of which is generally the same width as the head. (Callistomorphus has a wider ("flared") pronotum and a long rostrum). Other general traits that can be used to differentiate from more distant relatives are the conical pronotum and rugged, bumpy wing-cases. Stephanorhynchus species, like those in the genera Callistomorphus and Glabrorhynchus, have asymmetrical aedeagi. The weevils are also relatively large – 4.70–7.50 millimetres (0.185–0.295 in) long. Stephanorhynchus species are generally grey to brown in colour. The larvae are little-studied but similar to those of Scolopterus (Eugnomini: Eugnomina).

== Taxonomy ==
Stephanorhynchus was erected in 1846 with one species, S. curvipes, by Adam White in a report on insect fauna found on the Ross expedition. White noted a resemblance to Curculio attelaboides, a species described by Fabricius in 1775 but, due to an erroneous record asserting that species was found in Brazil, created a new genus. C. attelaboides has since been moved to the genus Stephanorhynchus.

The name Stephanorhynchus incorporates the prefix stephano-, derived from the Ancient Greek stephanos (στέφανος; 'crown' or 'wreath') meaning 'wreath-like', and rhynchos (ῥύγχος; 'snout'), from the same language. The combined name ('wreath-snout') refers to the ridge on the top side of the rostrum.

Stepanorhynchus is currently placed in the subfamily Curculioninae, tribe Eugnomini, which reaches its greatest diversity in the New Zealand region. A taxonomic revision published in 2024 in The European Zoological Journal split the genus into four, with the creation of three new genera constructed from species formerly classified in Stephanorhynchus: Pittosporobius (1 species), Moanus (4 spp.), and Glabrorhynchus (4 spp.) The 2024 revision described the four genera, along with the preexisting Callistomorphus, as forming a genus complex. The genus Stephanorhynchus, as circumscribed since then, includes the following species:

Name	Image	Distribution	New Zealand conservation status
Stephanorhynchus aper Sharp, 1886		Patchy records around South and North islands.	At Risk; Naturally Uncommon
Stephanorhynchus attelaboides (Fabricius, 1775)		South Island except for the southern part of the Southern Alps; central and southern North Island	At Risk; Naturally Uncommon
Stephanorhynchus curvipes White, 1846		Throughout the North Island; patchy distribution throughout the South Island; Chathams	Not Threatened
Stephanorhynchus tuberosus Broun, 1881		Patchy records from throughout the North Island; entire west coast of South Island	At Risk; Naturally Uncommon
