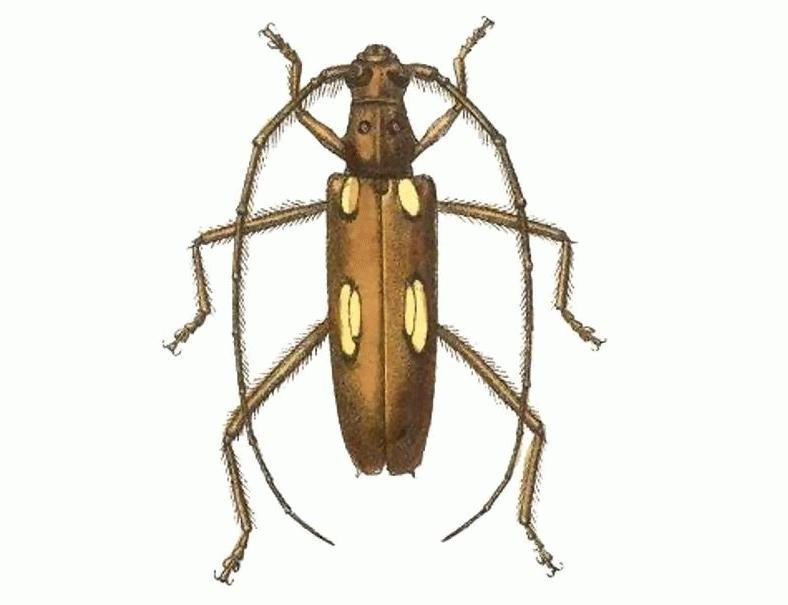
- Eburodacrys callixantha

Scientific classification
- Domain: Eukaryota
- Kingdom: Animalia
- Phylum: Arthropoda
- Class: Insecta
- Order: Coleoptera
- Suborder: Polyphaga
- Infraorder: Cucujiformia
- Family: Cerambycidae
- Tribe: Eburiini
- Genus: Eburodacrys; White, 1853

= Eburodacrys =

Genus of beetles

Eburodacrys is a genus of beetles in the family Cerambycidae, containing the following species:

- Eburodacrys aenigma Galileo & Martins, 2006
- Eburodacrys alini Napp & Martins, 1980
- Eburodacrys amazonica Melzer, 1927
- Eburodacrys apua Martins & Galileo, 2005
- Eburodacrys asperula Bates, 1880
- Eburodacrys assimilis Gounelle, 1909
- Eburodacrys ayri Galileo & Martins, 2006
- Eburodacrys bezarki Botero, 2017
- Eburodacrys biffipradorum Martins & Galileo, 2012
- Eburodacrys bilineata Joly, 1992
- Eburodacrys callixantha Bates, 1872
- Eburodacrys campestris Gounelle, 1909
- Eburodacrys catarina Galileo & Martins, 1992
- Eburodacrys cincora Martins, Galileo & Limeira-de-Oliveira, 2011
- Eburodacrys coalescens Bates, 1884
- Eburodacrys costai Gounelle, 1909
- Eburodacrys crassimana Gounelle, 1909
- Eburodacrys crassipes Martins & Galileo, 2008
- Eburodacrys cunusaia Martins, 1997
- Eburodacrys decipiens Gounelle, 1909
- Eburodacrys dubitata White, 1853
- Eburodacrys eburioides (White, 1853)
- Eburodacrys eduardoi Botero, 2017
- Eburodacrys elegantula Gounelle, 1909
- Eburodacrys errata Galileo & Martins, 2010
- Eburodacrys eurytibialis Monné & Martins, 1992
- Eburodacrys flexuosa Gounelle, 1909
- Eburodacrys fortunata Lameere, 1884
- Eburodacrys fraterna Galileo & Martins, 2010
- Eburodacrys gaucha Galileo & Martins, 1992
- Eburodacrys gigas (Gounelle, 1909)
- Eburodacrys granipennis Gounelle, 1909
- Eburodacrys guttata Martins & Galileo, 2005
- Eburodacrys havanensis Chevrolat, 1862
- Eburodacrys hirsutula Bates, 1870
- Eburodacrys inaequalis Galileo & Martins, 2009
- Eburodacrys laevicornis Bates, 1884
- Eburodacrys lancinata Napp & Martins, 1980
- Eburodacrys lanei Zajciw, 1958
- Eburodacrys lenkoi Napp & Martins, 1980
- Eburodacrys lepida Martins, 1973
- Eburodacrys longilineata White, 1853
- Eburodacrys luederwaldti Melzer, 1922
- Eburodacrys lugubris Gounelle, 1909
- Eburodacrys mancula White, 1853
- Eburodacrys martinezi Martins, 1997
- Eburodacrys mcgavini Pett, 2019
- Eburodacrys megaspilota White, 1853
- Eburodacrys monticola Monné & Martins, 1973
- Eburodacrys moruna Martins, 1997
- Eburodacrys nemorivaga Gounelle, 1909
- Eburodacrys notula Gounelle, 1909
- Eburodacrys obscura Martins, 1973
- Eburodacrys perspicillaris (Erichson in Schomburg, 1848)
- Eburodacrys pilicornis Fisher, 1944
- Eburodacrys pinima Martins, 1999
- Eburodacrys prolixa Monné & Martins, 1992
- Eburodacrys puella (Newman, 1840)
- Eburodacrys pumila Monné & Martins, 1992
- Eburodacrys punctipennis White, 1853
- Eburodacrys putia Galileo & Martins, 2006
- Eburodacrys quadridens (Fabricius, 1801)
- Eburodacrys raripila Bates, 1870
- Eburodacrys rhabdota Martins, 1967
- Eburodacrys rubicunda Monné & Martins, 1992
- Eburodacrys rufispinis Bates, 1870
- Eburodacrys sanguinipes Gounelle, 1909
- Eburodacrys santossilvai Botero, 2017
- Eburodacrys seabrai Zajciw, 1958
- Eburodacrys seminigra Gounelle, 1909
- Eburodacrys separata Martins, Galileo & Limeira-de-Oliveira, 2011
- Eburodacrys sexguttata Lameere, 1884
- Eburodacrys sexmaculata (Olivier, 1790)
- Eburodacrys silviamariae Galileo & Martins, 2006
- Eburodacrys skillmanni Galileo, Martins & Santos-Silva, 2015
- Eburodacrys stahli Aurivillius, 1893
- Eburodacrys sticticollis Bates, 1874
- Eburodacrys sulfurifera Gounelle, 1909
- Eburodacrys sulphureosignata (Erichson, 1847)
- Eburodacrys superba Napp & Martins, 1980
- Eburodacrys translucida Galileo & Martins, 2010
- Eburodacrys trilineata (Aurivillius, 1893)
- Eburodacrys triocellata (Stål, 1857)
- Eburodacrys truncata Fuchs, 1956
- Eburodacrys tuberosa Gounelle, 1909
- Eburodacrys vidua (Lacordaire, 1869)
- Eburodacrys vittata (Blanchard, 1847)
- Eburodacrys wappesi Galileo, Martins & Santos-Silva, 2015
- Eburodacrys xirica Martins & Galileo, 2005
- Eburodacrys yolandae Botero, 2017
