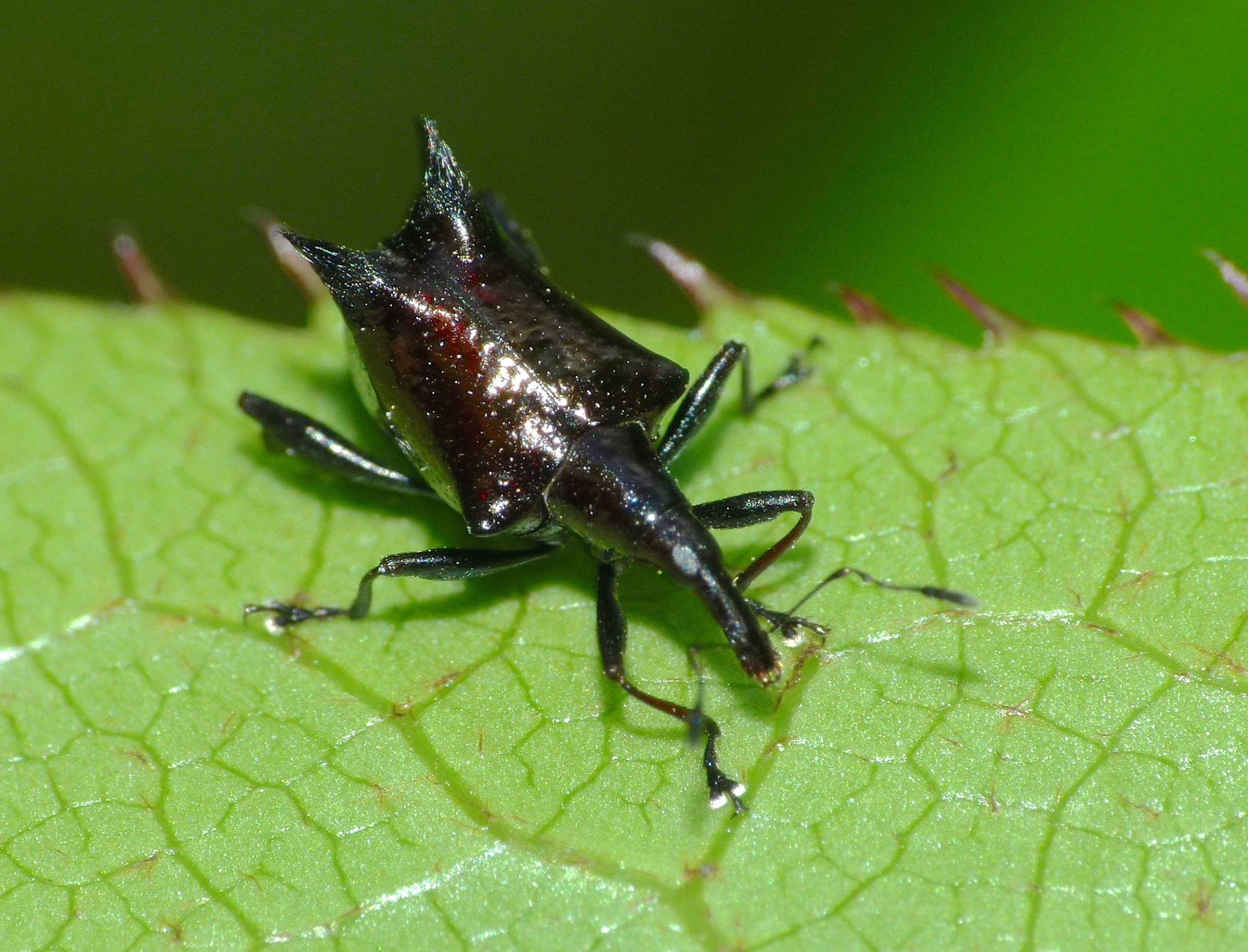

Scientific classification
- Kingdom: Animalia
- Phylum: Arthropoda
- Clade: Pancrustacea
- Class: Insecta
- Order: Coleoptera
- Suborder: Polyphaga
- Infraorder: Cucujiformia
- Superfamily: Curculionoidea
- Family: Curculionidae
- Genus: Scolopterus
- Species: S. penicillatus

Binomial name
- Scolopterus penicillatus White, 1846

= Scolopterus penicillatus =

Scolopterus penicillatus Temporal range: Late Holocene

Species of beetle

Scolopterus penicillatus, also known as the black spined weevil, is an endemic beetle of New Zealand.

== Physical description ==
In appearance it is a shining black colour with a purplish tinge and looks very similar to its close relative Scolopterus tetracanthus. S. penicillatus can be distinguished from S. tetracanthus as the spines on the shoulders of the former are much less pointed.

== Distribution and habitat ==
The beetle is present throughout New Zealand and can be discovered by beating native flowering plants in the summer months. Adult black spined weevils have been collected from Hedychium gardnerianum and caught in the flowers of Helichrysum lanceolatum. They have also been collected from Urostemon on Hen Island. The larvae of S. penicillatus are known to develop in the recently dead bark of the various species of Pseudopanax.

R A Crowson of Glasgow University spent some time in New Zealand in 1956 and 1957 during which period he found larvae associated with pupae and teneral adults under the bark of a dead branch of a Nothopanax. The larvae were found at Parahaki and Nelson and were later identified by him and Sir G. A. K. Marshall as Scolopterus penicillatus.

=== Fossils ===
An elytron identified as belonging to Scolopterus penicillatus was found preserved in a late Holocene (6000–1000 years BP) in the Awatere river valley.
