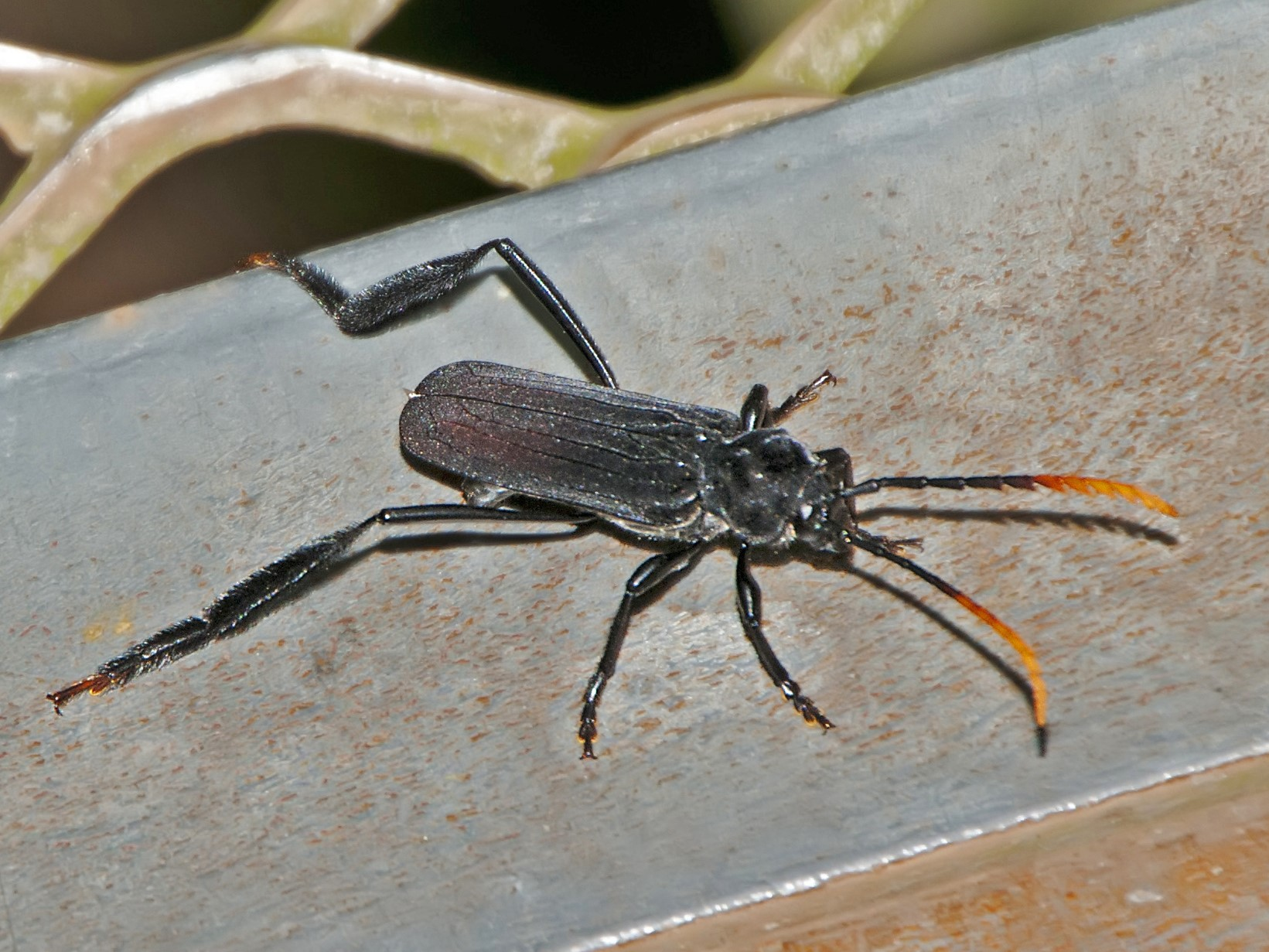

Scientific classification
- Kingdom: Animalia
- Phylum: Arthropoda
- Class: Insecta
- Order: Coleoptera
- Suborder: Polyphaga
- Infraorder: Cucujiformia
- Family: Cerambycidae
- Genus: Polyschisis
- Species: P. melanaria

Binomial name
- Polyschisis melanaria White, 1853

= Polyschisis melanaria =

Species of beetle

Polyschisis melanaria is a species of beetle in the family Cerambycidae. It was first described by Adam White in 1853.
