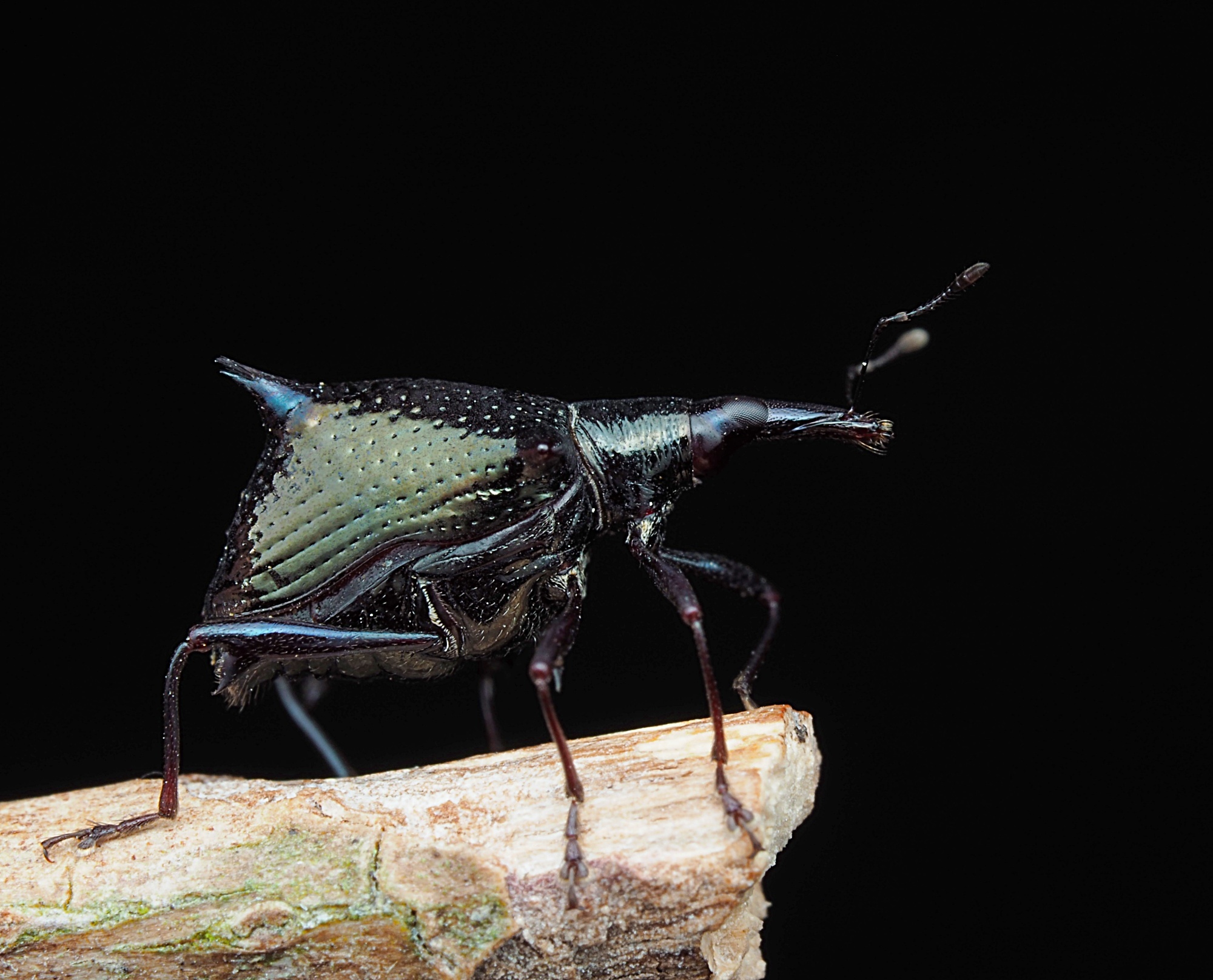

Scientific classification
- Kingdom: Animalia
- Phylum: Arthropoda
- Clade: Pancrustacea
- Class: Insecta
- Order: Coleoptera
- Suborder: Polyphaga
- Infraorder: Cucujiformia
- Superfamily: Curculionoidea
- Family: Curculionidae
- Tribe: Eugnomini
- Subtribe: Eugnomina
- Genus: Scolopterus
- Species: S. aequus

Binomial name
- Scolopterus aequus Broun, 1880

Synonyms
- Scolopterus aeneorufus Broun, 1881; Scolopterus submetallicus Colenso, 1882

= Scolopterus aequus =

Species of beetle

Scolopterus aequus is a species of flower weevil found only in New Zealand. The beetles are relatively common and live on bushes and trees; they eat flower pollen from most plant species and are often observed on flowers. First described in 1880 from a specimen on the Coromandel Peninsula, the beetles are most abundant on New Zealand's North Island, though they have also been recorded from the West Coast Region. The weevil larvae develop for several months in the rachis ("stems") of fern fronds, particularly those of silver ferns, before pupating for a short time. Two other weevil species described in the genus Scolopterus are now considered synonymous with S. aequus.

== Taxonomy ==
Scolopterus aequus was first scientifically described in an 1880 book by Thomas Broun, Manual of the New Zealand Coleoptera. Broun placed the new species, which retains his original name, (Note: Broun spelled it æquus) in the genus Scolopterus. In Latin, aequus means 'equal', 'similar', or 'fair'; Broun's reason for naming the species such is not recorded. The genus Scolopterus had been described with three species a few decades earlier by Adam White, in a report on entomological discoveries made in New Zealand on the Ross expedition.

In 1990, Guillermo Kuschel synonymized two other, little-known Scolopterus species both described in the late 19th century – S. aeneorufus and S. submetallicus – with S. aequus.S. aeneorufus was described by Thomas Broun in 1881 in the second volume of his Manual. (It would go on to have seven volumes, the last published in 1893.) Broun described S. aeneorufus as a dark, glossy red species, based on one specimen he collected near Whangārei Harbour. S. submetallicus had been described as a glossy, "black-green" species similar to S. tetracanthus in 1882 by William Colenso, based on a specimen found by chance near the Manawatū River.

White had placed his genus broadly in the Curculionidae; Broun considered it a member of the "Scolopteridæ", a classification no longer in use. As of 2010, S. aequus finds itself in the family Curculionidae, subfamily Curculioninae, tribe Eugnomini, subtribe Eugnomina. "Scolopteridaæ" (type genus Scolopterus) is now considered a synonym of the Eugnomina.

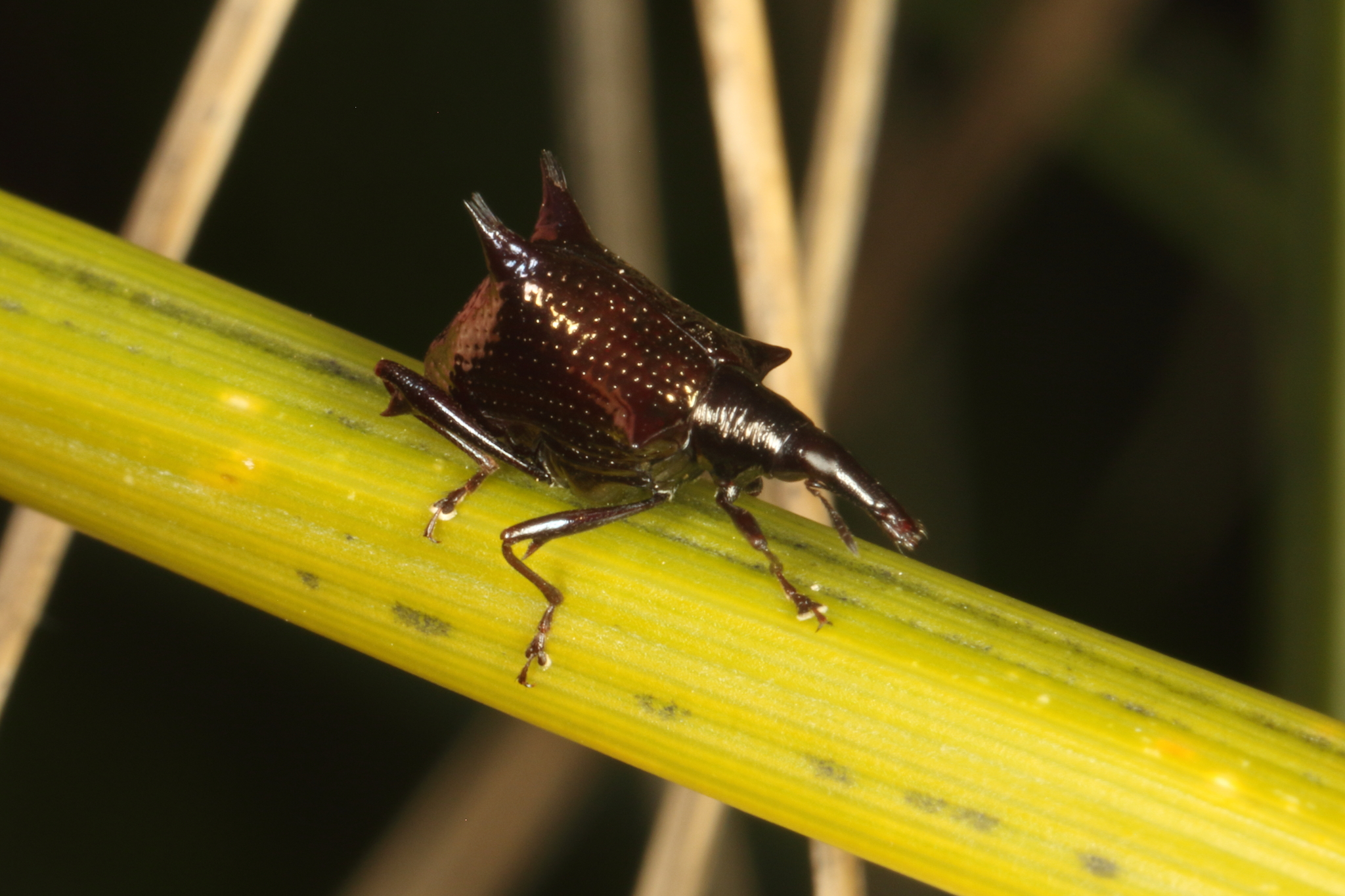
One beetle observed in Tararua Forest Park, near Palmerston North.

== Distribution, habitat, and ecology ==
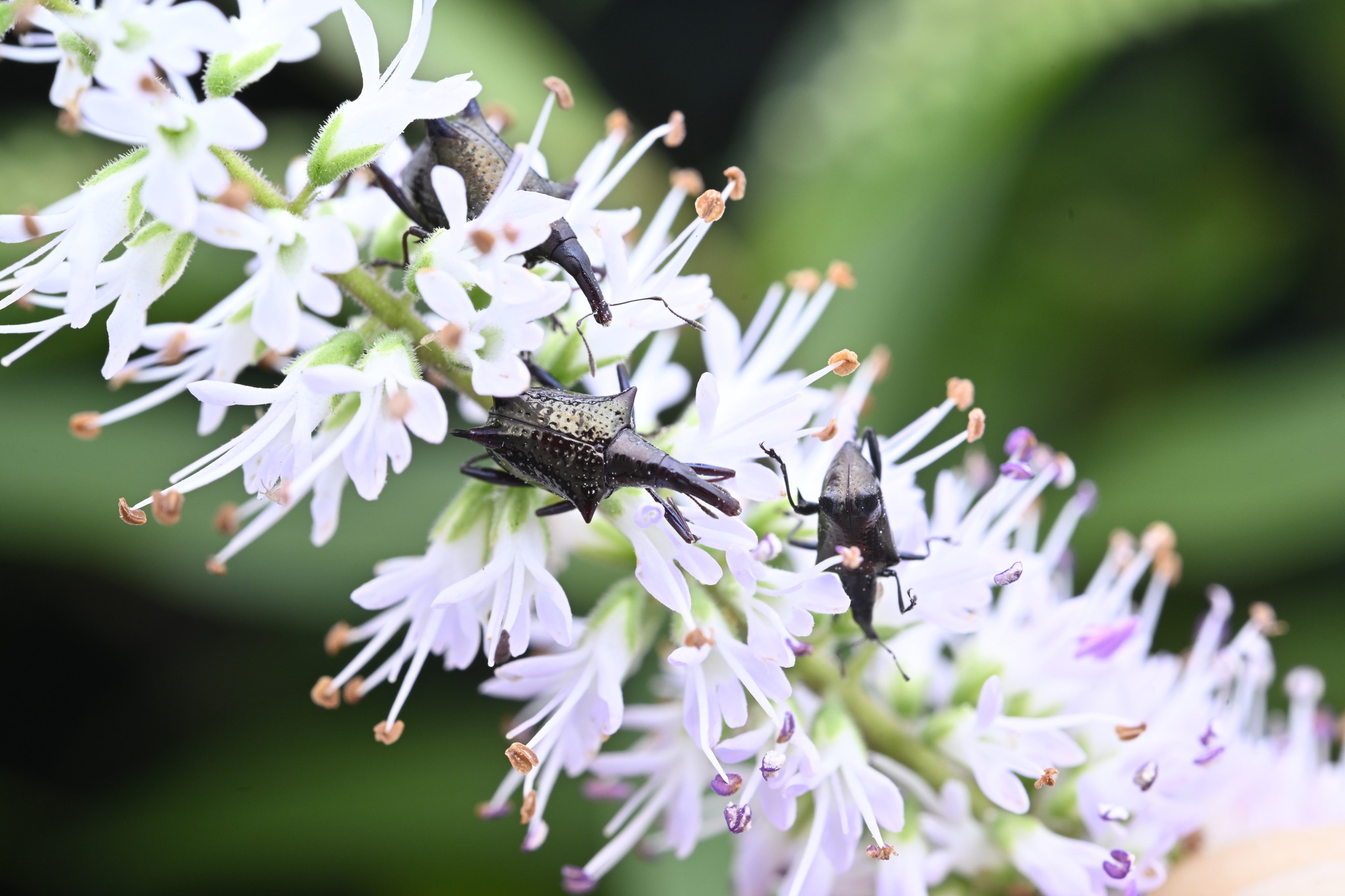
Several S. aequus beetles on a flower near Auckland.

Scolopterus aequus is endemic to New Zealand. Broun described S. aequus based on a single specimen collected from Tairua, on the North Island's Coromandel Peninsula. The Global Biodiversity Information Facility (GBIF) records observations most abundant on the North Island, where it is found everywhere except the central highlands and much of the Gisborne and Hawke's Bay region. In the South Island, there are scattered records across the West Coast region.

S. aequus is a common species that lives in bushes and the forest canopy. They can often be found on flowers in summer and autumn, as the beetles eat the pollen of "almost every flowering plant".

== Development ==
Scolopterus larvae develop in decaying plant matter, and S. aequus develop in rotting wood and fern fronds. It has been observed to have a preference for tree ferns of the family Cyatheaceae. Larvae and pupal coccoons have been found in the rachis ("stem") of decaying silver fern fronds (Cyathea dealbata), and juvenile S. aequus have been successfully reared in a lab on dead fronds of the same species. Larvae observed in dead silver fern fronds developed by and large in a central cavity – the more remote parts of the frond were home to other, smaller weevil larvae. A 1987 study found that C. dealbata is home to the larvae of at least four weevil species in total. S. aequus larvae develop slowly, and may take at least four months to begin to pupate. They stay in the pupa for two weeks until the young adult bites its way out of the cocoon, which is constructed of torn-up plant fibres.
