= Eburodacrys eburioides =

Scientific classification
- Kingdom: Animalia
- Phylum: Arthropoda
- Clade: Pancrustacea
- Class: Insecta
- Order: Coleoptera
- Suborder: Polyphaga
- Infraorder: Cucujiformia
- Family: Cerambycidae
- Genus: Eburodacrys
- Species: E. eburioides

Binomial name
- Eburodacrys eburioides (White, 1853)

Species of beetle

Eburodacrys eburioides is a species of beetle in the family Cerambycidae. It was described by Adam White in 1853. It is found in Brazil (Goiás, Bahia, Minas Gerais, Espírito Santo, Rio de Janeiro, São Paulo, Paraná, Santa Catarina, Rio Grande do Sul), Paraguay and Argentina (Misiones).
