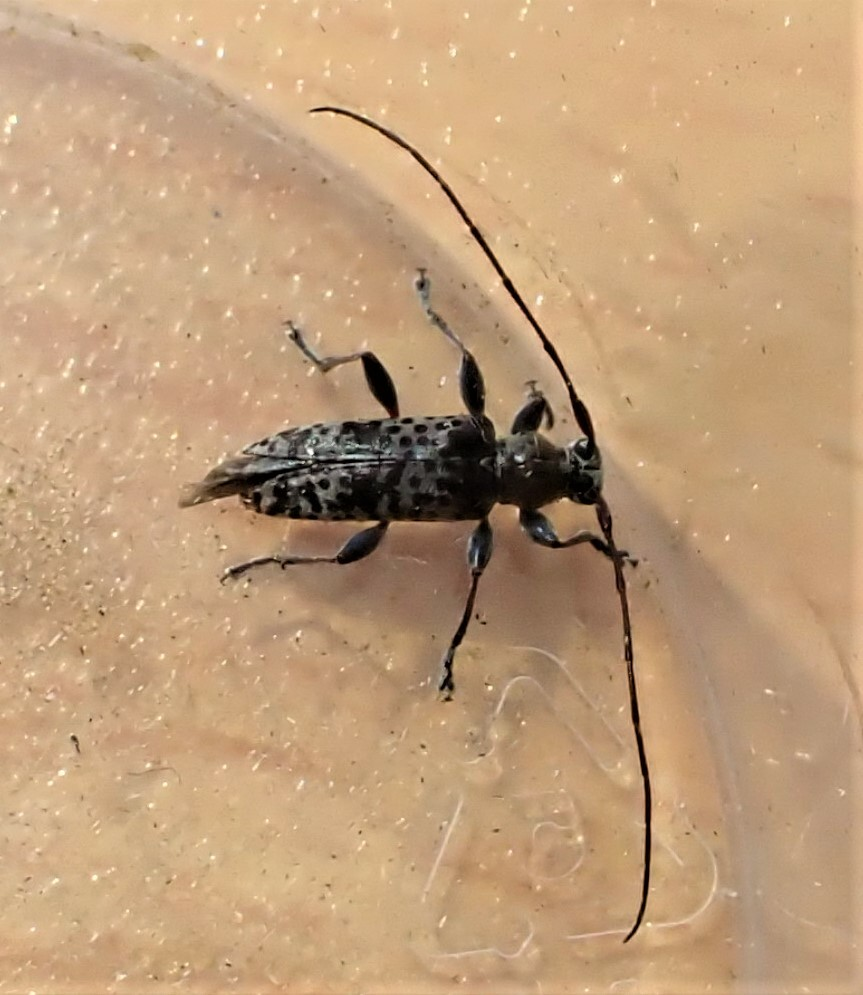
- Stenellipsis gracilis, New Zealand

Scientific classification
- Kingdom: Animalia
- Phylum: Arthropoda
- Class: Insecta
- Order: Coleoptera
- Suborder: Polyphaga
- Infraorder: Cucujiformia
- Family: Cerambycidae
- Subfamily: Lamiinae
- Tribe: Acanthocinini
- Genus: Stenellipsis
- Species: S. gracilis

Binomial name
- Stenellipsis gracilis (White, 1846)

Synonyms
- Xylotoles gracilis White, 1846

= Stenellipsis gracilis =

Species of beetle

Stenellipsis gracilis is a species of flat-faced longhorn in the beetle family Cerambycidae, found in New Zealand.

== Taxonomy ==
This species was originally described as Xylotoles gracilis in 1846 by Adam White.

== Distribution and habitat ==
This species is only recorded from the North Island of New Zealand. It can often be found on flowers from December to February.
