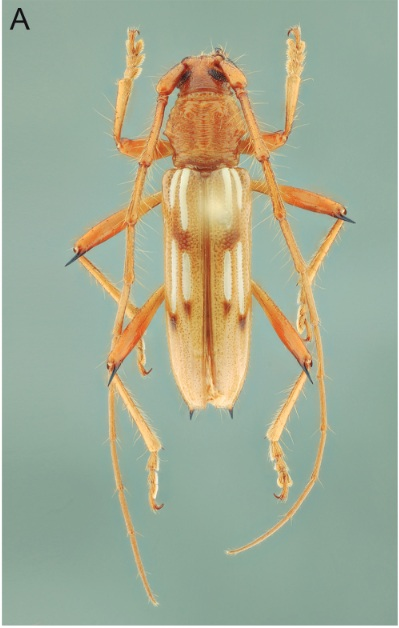

Scientific classification
- Kingdom: Animalia
- Phylum: Arthropoda
- Clade: Pancrustacea
- Class: Insecta
- Order: Coleoptera
- Suborder: Polyphaga
- Infraorder: Cucujiformia
- Family: Cerambycidae
- Genus: Eburodacrys
- Species: E. dubitata

Binomial name
- Eburodacrys dubitata White, 1853

Synonyms
- Eburodacrys subaffinis White, 1853

= Eburodacrys dubitata =

Species of beetle

Eburodacrys dubitata is a species of beetle in the family Cerambycidae. It was described by Adam White in 1853. It is found in Bolivia, Brazil, Paraguay, Argentina and Uruguay.
