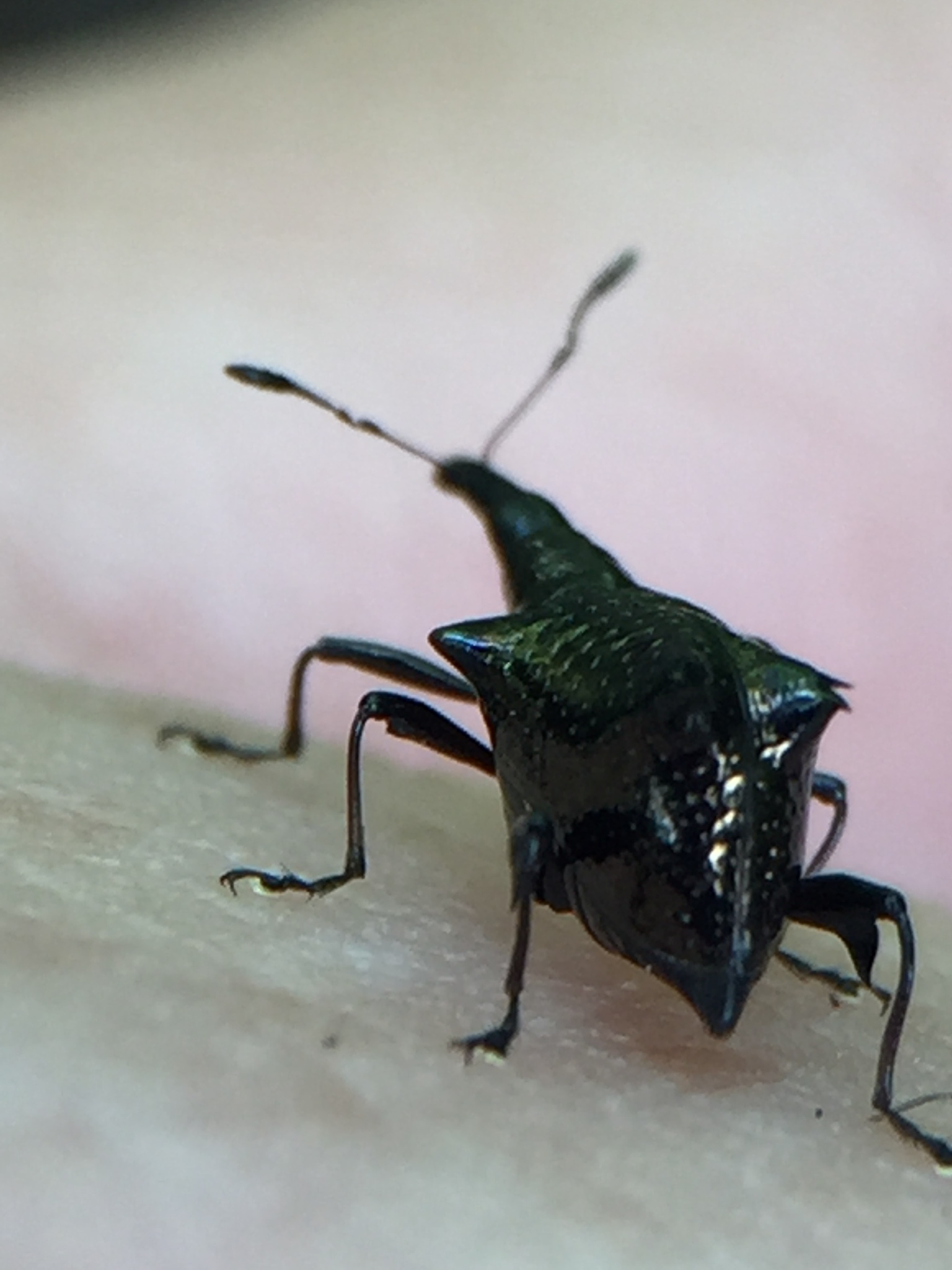
- Scolopterus tetracanthus seen in Titirangi, Auckland, New Zealand

Scientific classification
- Kingdom: Animalia
- Phylum: Arthropoda
- Clade: Pancrustacea
- Class: Insecta
- Order: Coleoptera
- Suborder: Polyphaga
- Infraorder: Cucujiformia
- Family: Curculionidae
- Genus: Scolopterus
- Species: S. tetracanthus

Binomial name
- Scolopterus tetracanthus White, 1846
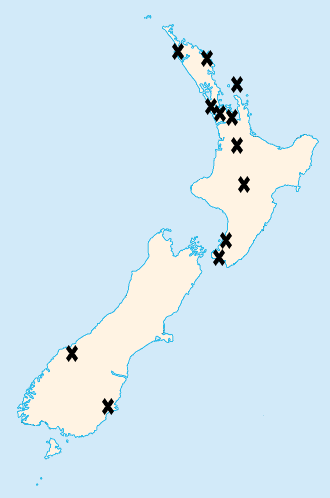
- S.tetracanthus observations, range map from Global Biodiversity Information Facility (GBIF) (1920–2024)

= Scolopterus tetracanthus =

Species of beetle

Scolopterus tetracanthus, more commonly known as the four-spined weevil, is a beetle of the genus Scolopterus. First described by A. White in 1846, it is endemic to New Zealand.

== Taxonomy ==
The species was described by Scottish zoologist Adam White in 1846, who based his description on specimens collected during the Ross expedition. Thomas Broun designated S. tetracanthus as the type species of the genus Scolopterus in 1880.

== Physical characteristics ==
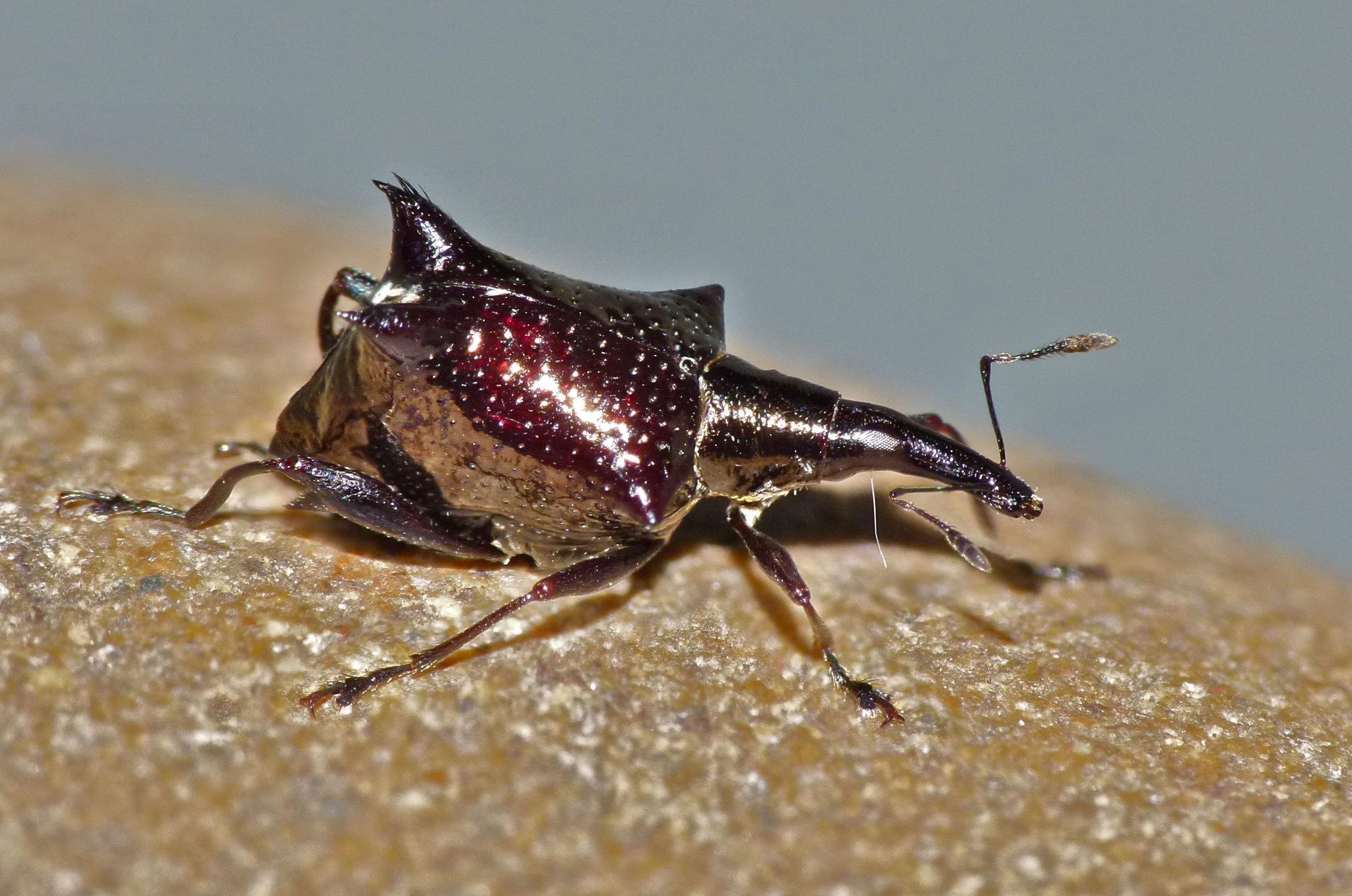
S. tetracanthus observed in Dunedin

White's original text (the type description) reads as follows:

Head and thorax deep black; elytra greenish bronze, the spines purplish black, the femora purplish black, the remainder of the legs purplish ferruginous; head and thorax quite smooth; elytra very deeply punctured in lines, the shoulders produced into a thick angular spine directed outwards and very slightly upwards; each elytron about the middle with a strong spine near the suture directed somewhat backwards and tufted with hair at the end; the intermediate femora with a compressed spine below near the end.

The four-spined weevil is highly distinct in appearance, with knobs and spines common on its physical form. The shoulder of each elytron forms into an acute cone, with a sharp spine at the summit of the hind slope, distinguishing them from their less pointed and spiny cousin, Scolopterus penicillatus.

It is about 7–8 mm (0.28–0.31 in) long, usually shiny black with bronze or red reflections. Metallic and bright colours are not common in this family.

It has a smooth head and thorax, with elytra very deeply punctured in lines. One major feature of an elytra in Coleoptera is the striae, and in the case of Scoplopterus tetracanthus, they have very deeply prominent punctures.

Individuals within the genus of Scolopterus tend to have large, longitudinally oval eyes that are not convexed, and sit on the upper surface either side of their narrow head.

== Behaviour ==
The four-spined weevil is a pollinator of an endemic tree to New Zealand, Schefflera digitata, of the family Araliacaea, known also as patē, seven-finger, or umbrella tree.

== Distribution and habitat ==
Distribution

They are naturally uncommon, but distributed in forest throughout North Island of New Zealand, with very few observations recorded in South Island

Habitat

Four-spined weevils are known to breed in dead and rotting timber. The larvae of Scoplopterus require dead wood to eat and grow. Adults can be found in spring, summer and autumn.
