= Eburodacrys seabrai =

Scientific classification
- Kingdom: Animalia
- Phylum: Arthropoda
- Class: Insecta
- Order: Coleoptera
- Suborder: Polyphaga
- Infraorder: Cucujiformia
- Family: Cerambycidae
- Genus: Eburodacrys
- Species: E. seabrai

Binomial name
- Eburodacrys seabrai Zajciw, 1958

Species of beetle

Eburodacrys seabrai is a species of beetle in the family Cerambycidae. It was described by Zajciw in 1958.
