= Eburodacrys sexmaculata =

Scientific classification
- Kingdom: Animalia
- Phylum: Arthropoda
- Clade: Pancrustacea
- Class: Insecta
- Order: Coleoptera
- Suborder: Polyphaga
- Infraorder: Cucujiformia
- Family: Cerambycidae
- Genus: Eburodacrys
- Species: E. sexmaculata

Binomial name
- Eburodacrys sexmaculata (Olivier, 1790)

Species of beetle

Eburodacrys sexmaculata is a species of beetle in the family Cerambycidae. It was described by Guillaume-Antoine Olivier in 1790.
