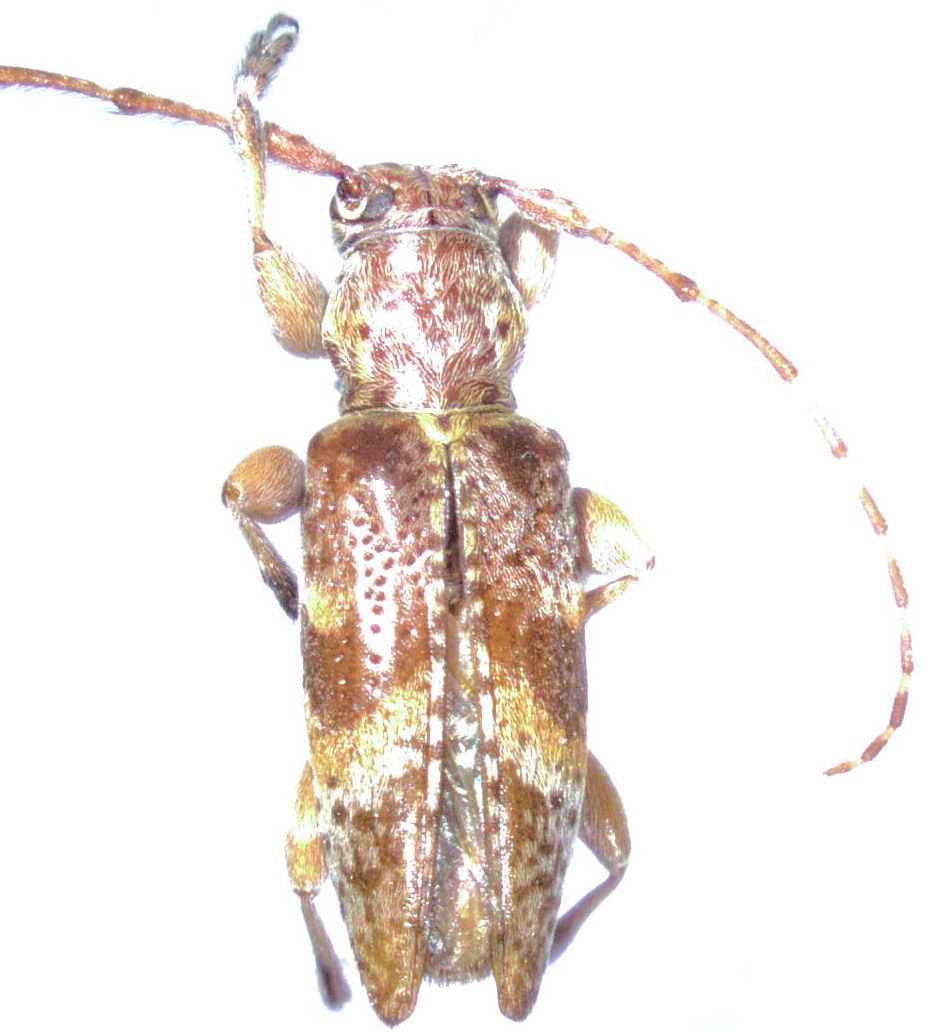
- Stenellipsis cuneata from New Zealand
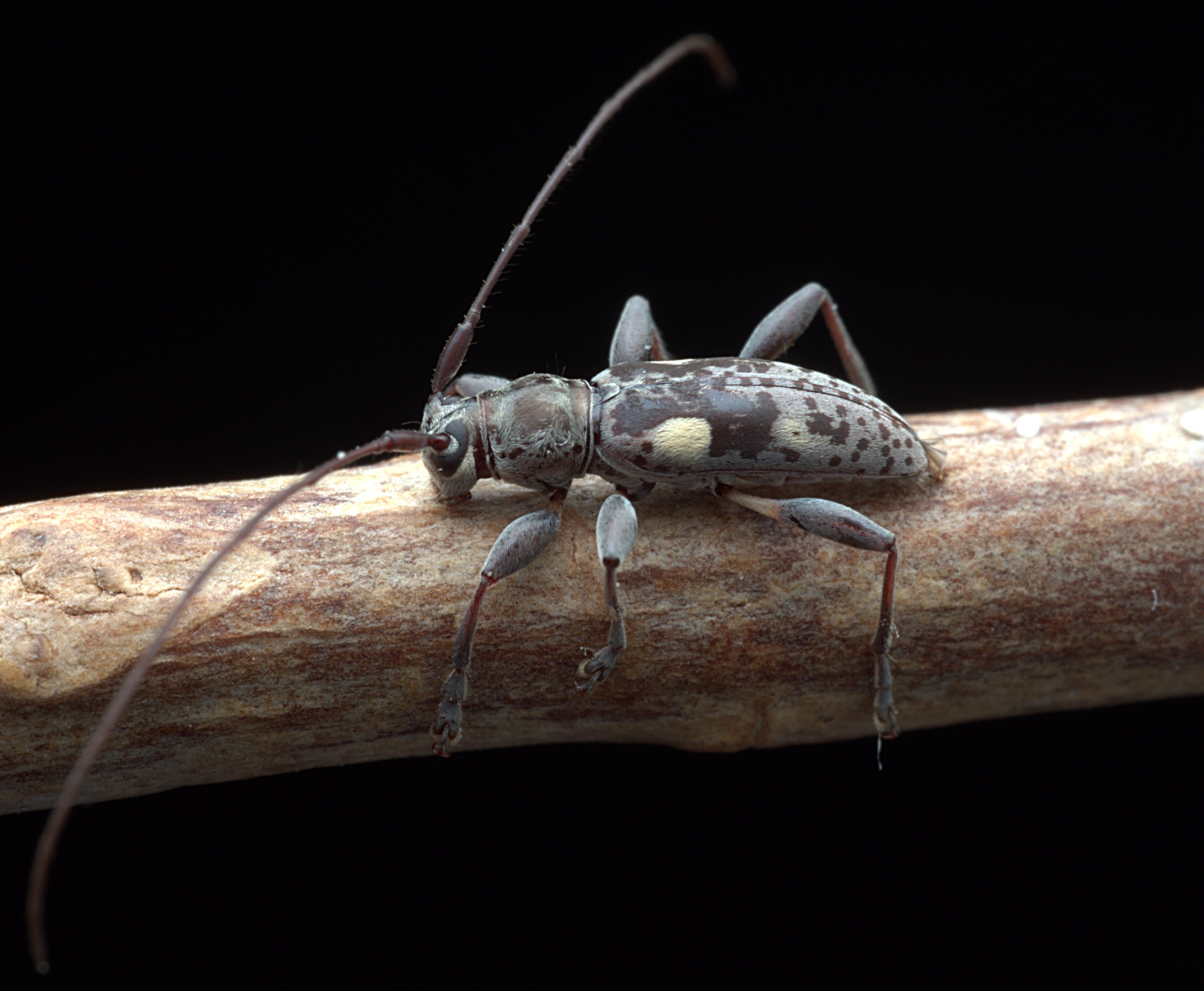
- Stenellipsis bimaculata from New Zealand

Scientific classification
- Kingdom: Animalia
- Phylum: Arthropoda
- Clade: Pancrustacea
- Class: Insecta
- Order: Coleoptera
- Suborder: Polyphaga
- Infraorder: Cucujiformia
- Family: Cerambycidae
- Subfamily: Lamiinae
- Tribe: Acanthocinini
- Genus: Stenellipsis; Bates, 1874

Synonyms
- Eurychaena Bates, 1874

= Stenellipsis =

Genus of beetles

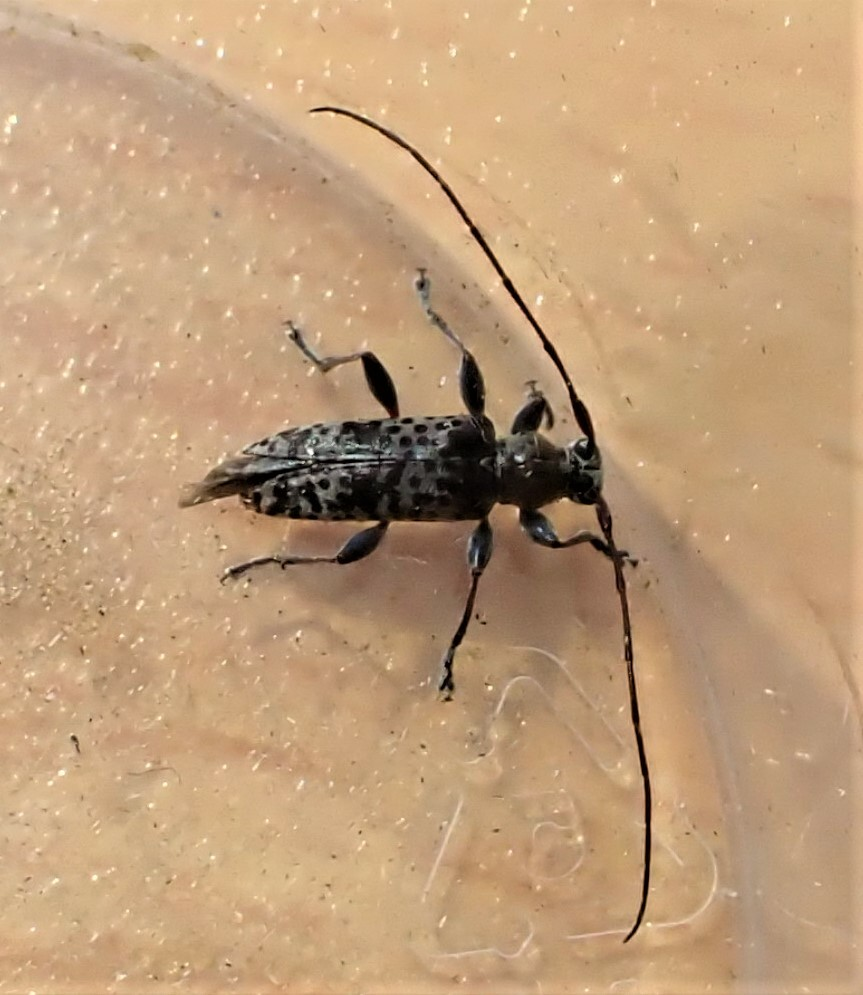
Stenellipsis gracilis from New Zealand.

Stenellipsis is a genus of flat-faced longhorn (Cerambycidae) beetle that belongs to the tribe Acanthocinini. Members of this genus are found throughout Oceania in New Zealand, New Caledonia, and Australia.

== Taxonomy ==
The genus was described by Bates in 1874.

=== Species ===
These 52 species belong to the genus Stenellipsis:

- Stenellipsis albomaculipennis Breuning, 1969 New Caledonia
- Stenellipsis albosignata Breuning, 1938 New Caledonia
- Stenellipsis albosignatipennis Breuning, 1963 Australia
- Stenellipsis albovittata Breuning, 1978 New Caledonia (Caatvatch)
- Stenellipsis basicristata Breuning, 1948 Australia
- Stenellipsis bicolor (McKeown, 1945) Australia
- Stenellipsis bifasciata (Aurivillius, 1917) Australia
- Stenellipsis bimaculata (White, 1846) New Zealand
- Stenellipsis bipustulata (Montrouzier, 1861) New Caledonia (Lifou)
- Stenellipsis caledonica (Fauvel, 1906) New Caledonia
- Stenellipsis casteli Lepesme & Breuning, 1953 New Caledonia
- Stenellipsis clavata Sudre et al., 2021
- Stenellipsis cruciata Breuning, 1938 Australia
- Stenellipsis cuneata Sharp, 1886 New Zealand
- Stenellipsis flavolineata Breuning, 1938 New Caledonia
- Stenellipsis frontehirsuta Breuning, 1978 New Caledonia (Mt. Panié)
- Stenellipsis fuscolateripennis Breuning, 1966 New Zealand
- Stenellipsis fuscomarmorata Breuning, 1975 New Caledonia
- Stenellipsis geophila (Montrouzier, 1861) New Caledonia (Lifou)
- Stenellipsis goephanoides Breuning, 1963 Australia
- Stenellipsis goephanopsis Breuning, 1978 New Caledonia (Mt Koghi)
- Stenellipsis gracilis (White, 1846) New Zealand
- Stenellipsis grata (Broun, 1880) New Zealand
- Stenellipsis kaszabi Breuning, 1978 New Caledonia (Mt Koghi)
- Stenellipsis latipennis Bates, 1874 New Zealand
- Stenellipsis litterata (Fauvel, 1906) New Caledonia
- Stenellipsis longicollis Breuning & Heyrovský, 1965 Australia
- Stenellipsis longula Breuning, 1940 New Zealand
- Stenellipsis lunigera (Fauvel, 1906) New Caledonia
- Stenellipsis lunulata Sudre et al., 2021
- Stenellipsis maculata (Montrouzier, 1861) New Caledonia (Lifou)
- Stenellipsis marmorata Breuning, 1954 Australia
- Stenellipsis meckei Mille & Sudre, 2010 New Caledonia (Mt Do)
- Stenellipsis millei Cazères & Sudre, 2010 New Caledonia (Farino)
- Stenellipsis murina (Fauvel, 1906) New Caledonia
- Stenellipsis obscurithorax Breuning, 1978 New Caledonia (Mt. Panié)
- Stenellipsis ochraceotincta (Fauvel, 1906) New Caledonia
- Stenellipsis ochreoapicalis Breuning, 1943 Australia
- Stenellipsis pantherina Breuning, 1959 Australia
- Stenellipsis paracasteli Breuning, 1978 New Caledonia (Mt. Koghi)
- Stenellipsis parallela Breuning, 1940 New Zealand
- Stenellipsis parasericea Breuning, 1975 New Caledonia
- Stenellipsis persimilis Breuning, 1940 New Caledonia
- Stenellipsis rufomarmorata Breuning, 1978 New Caledonia (Mont Rembai)
- Stenellipsis schaumii (Montrouzier, 1861) New Caledonia
- Stenellipsis sculpturata (Broun, 1915) New Zealand
- Stenellipsis sericans Breuning, 1940 New Caledonia
- Stenellipsis similis Breuning, 1975 New Caledonia
- Stenellipsis spencei McKeown, 1942 Australia
- Stenellipsis strandi Breuning, 1940 New Caledonia
- Stenellipsis subunicolor Breuning, 1978 New Caledonia
- Stenellipsis unicolor Breuning, 1938 New Caledonia
