= Eburodacrys apua =

Scientific classification
- Kingdom: Animalia
- Phylum: Arthropoda
- Class: Insecta
- Order: Coleoptera
- Suborder: Polyphaga
- Infraorder: Cucujiformia
- Family: Cerambycidae
- Genus: Eburodacrys
- Species: E. apua

Binomial name
- Eburodacrys apua Martins & Galileo, 2005

Species of beetle

Eburodacrys apua is a species of beetle in the family Cerambycidae.
