= Eburodacrys rufispinis =

Scientific classification
- Kingdom: Animalia
- Phylum: Arthropoda
- Class: Insecta
- Order: Coleoptera
- Suborder: Polyphaga
- Infraorder: Cucujiformia
- Family: Cerambycidae
- Genus: Eburodacrys
- Species: E. rufispinis

Binomial name
- Eburodacrys rufispinis Bates, 1870

Species of beetle

Eburodacrys rufispinis is a species of beetle in the family Cerambycidae. It was described by Bates in 1870.
