= Eburodacrys asperula =

Scientific classification
- Kingdom: Animalia
- Phylum: Arthropoda
- Class: Insecta
- Order: Coleoptera
- Suborder: Polyphaga
- Infraorder: Cucujiformia
- Family: Cerambycidae
- Genus: Eburodacrys
- Species: E. asperula

Binomial name
- Eburodacrys asperula Bates, 1880

Species of beetle

Eburodacrys asperula is a species of beetle in the family Cerambycidae.
