= Eburodacrys havanensis =

Scientific classification
- Kingdom: Animalia
- Phylum: Arthropoda
- Clade: Pancrustacea
- Class: Insecta
- Order: Coleoptera
- Suborder: Polyphaga
- Infraorder: Cucujiformia
- Family: Cerambycidae
- Genus: Eburodacrys
- Species: E. havanensis

Binomial name
- Eburodacrys havanensis Chevrolat, 1862

Species of beetle

Eburodacrys havanensis is a species of beetle in the family Cerambycidae. It was described by Chevrolat in 1862. It is found in Cuba, Mexico, Nicaragua (Chontales), Costa Rica, Panama, Colombia (Tolima, Antioquia, Quindio, Meta, Cundinamarca, Huila, Putumayo, Santander), Bolivia (Beni, Santa Cruz), Brazil (Mato Grosso, Mato Grosso do Sul, Goiás, Distrito Federal, Maranhão, Piauí, Pernambuco, Bahia, Minas Gerais, Espírito Santo, Rio de Janeiro, São Paulo, Paraná, Santa Catarina, Rio Grande do Sul) and Paraguay (Guairá, Caaguazu).
