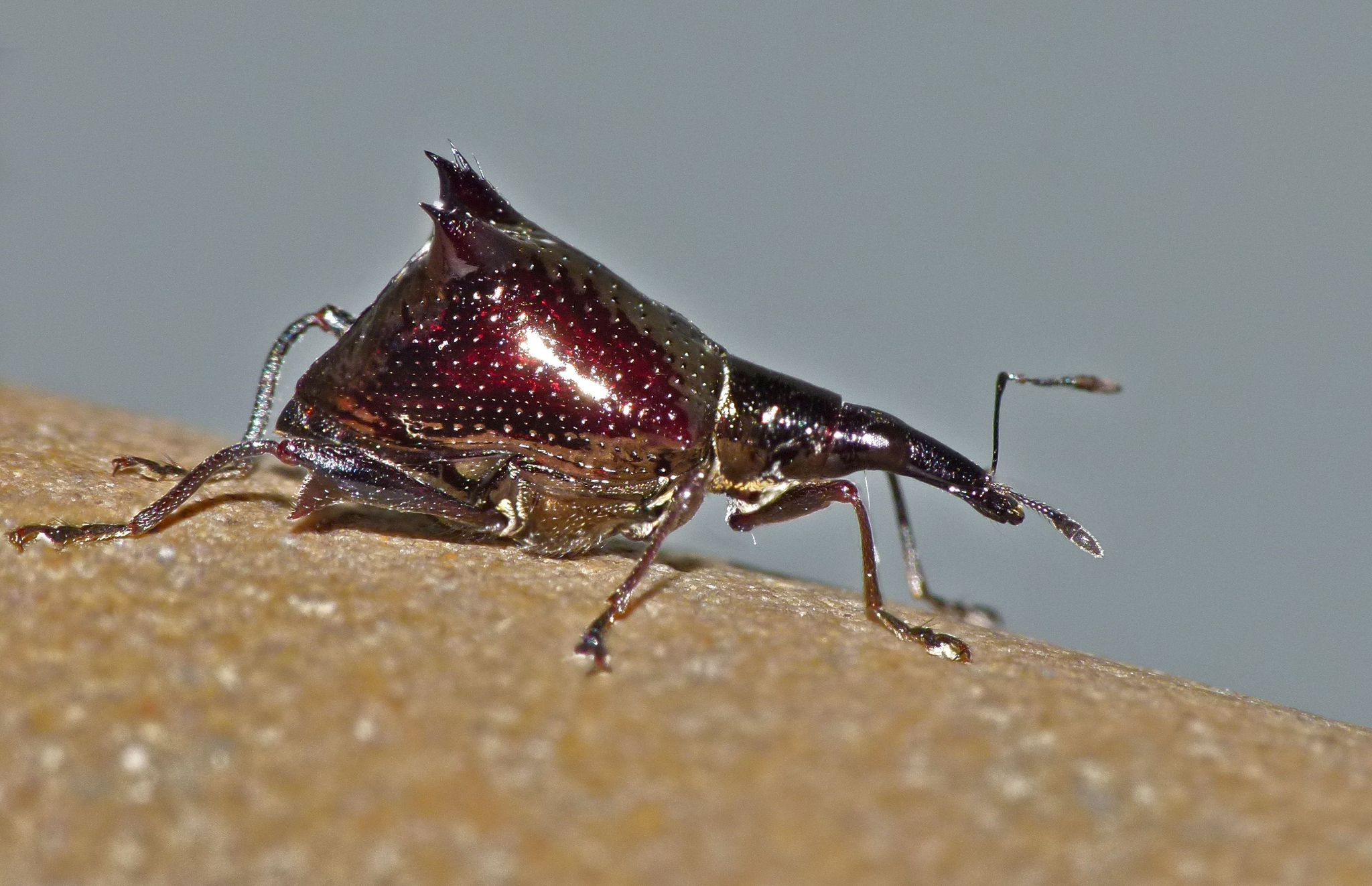
- Scolopterus tetracanthus
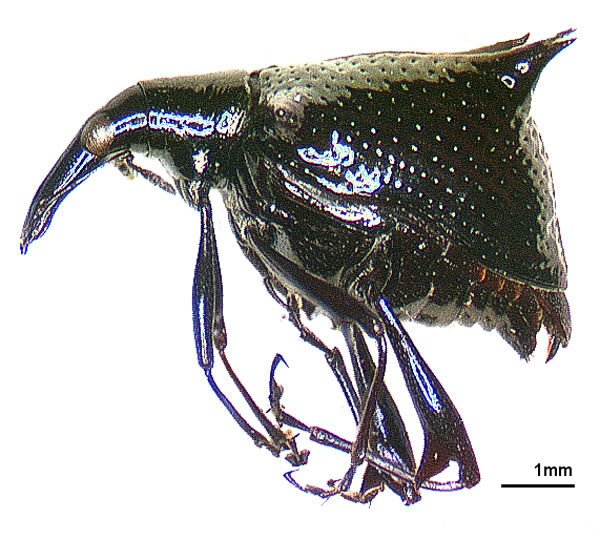
- Scolopterus aequus

Scientific classification
- Kingdom: Animalia
- Phylum: Arthropoda
- Class: Insecta
- Order: Coleoptera
- Suborder: Polyphaga
- Infraorder: Cucujiformia
- Family: Curculionidae
- Subtribe: Eugnomina
- Genus: Scolopterus; White, 1846

= Scolopterus =

Genus of beetles

Scolopterus is a genus of weevils belonging to the family Curculionidae that are native to New Zealand.

This genus was first described by Adam White in 1846. The type species for this genus is Scolopterus tetracanthus by original designation.

== Species ==
This genus contains the following species:

- Scolopterus aequus (Broun, 1880)
- Scolopterus penicillatus (black-spined weevil) White, 1846
- Scolopterus tetracanthus (four-spined weevil) White, 1846
