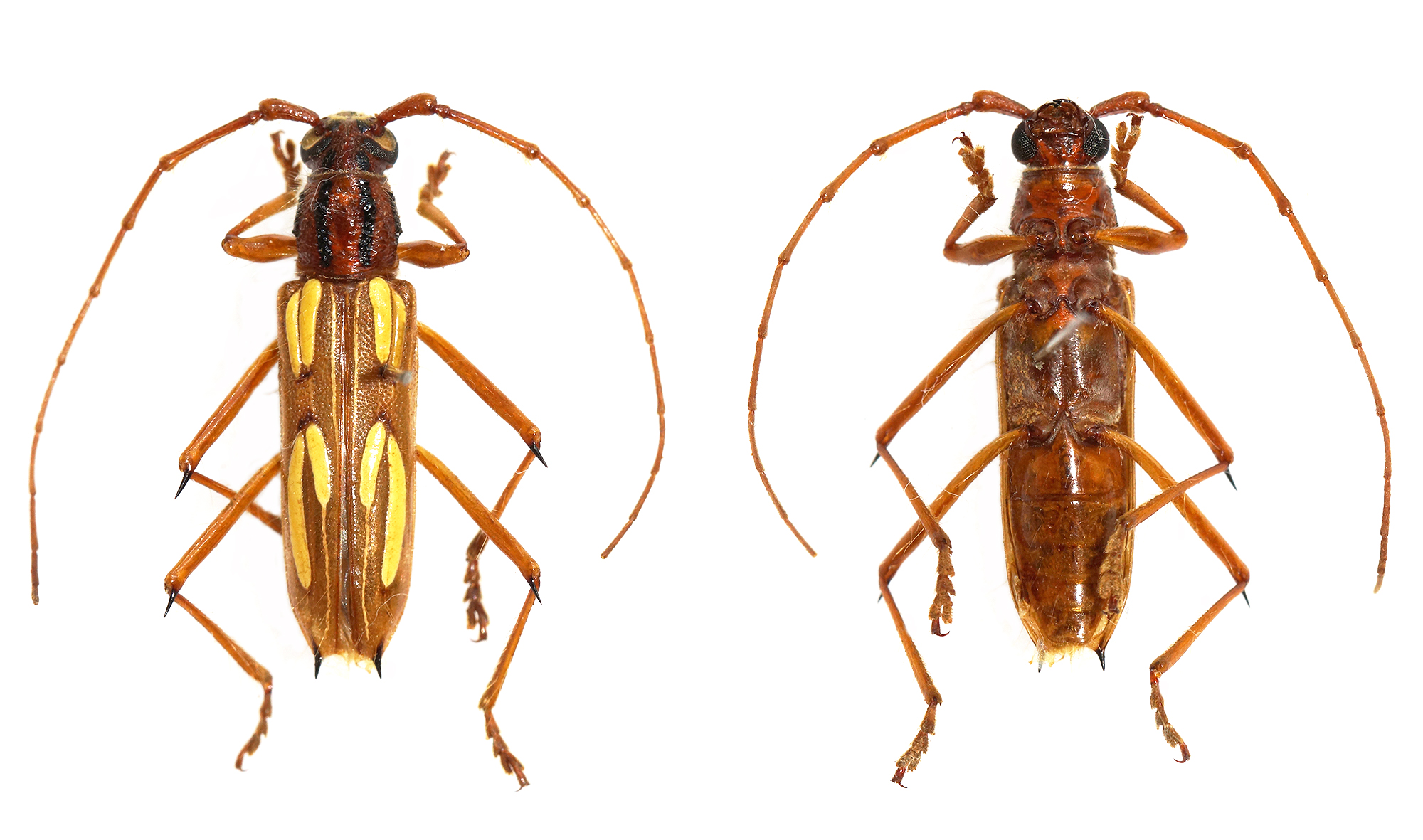

Scientific classification
- Kingdom: Animalia
- Phylum: Arthropoda
- Class: Insecta
- Order: Coleoptera
- Suborder: Polyphaga
- Infraorder: Cucujiformia
- Family: Cerambycidae
- Genus: Eburodacrys
- Species: E. lepida

Binomial name
- Eburodacrys lepida Martins, 1973

= Eburodacrys lepida =

Species of beetle

Eburodacrys lepida is a species of beetle in the family Cerambycidae. It was described by Martins in 1973.
