= Eburodacrys gigas =

Scientific classification
- Kingdom: Animalia
- Phylum: Arthropoda
- Class: Insecta
- Order: Coleoptera
- Suborder: Polyphaga
- Infraorder: Cucujiformia
- Family: Cerambycidae
- Genus: Eburodacrys
- Species: E. gigas

Binomial name
- Eburodacrys gigas (Gounelle, 1909)

Species of beetle

Eburodacrys gigas is a species of beetle in the family Cerambycidae. It was described by Gounelle in 1909.
