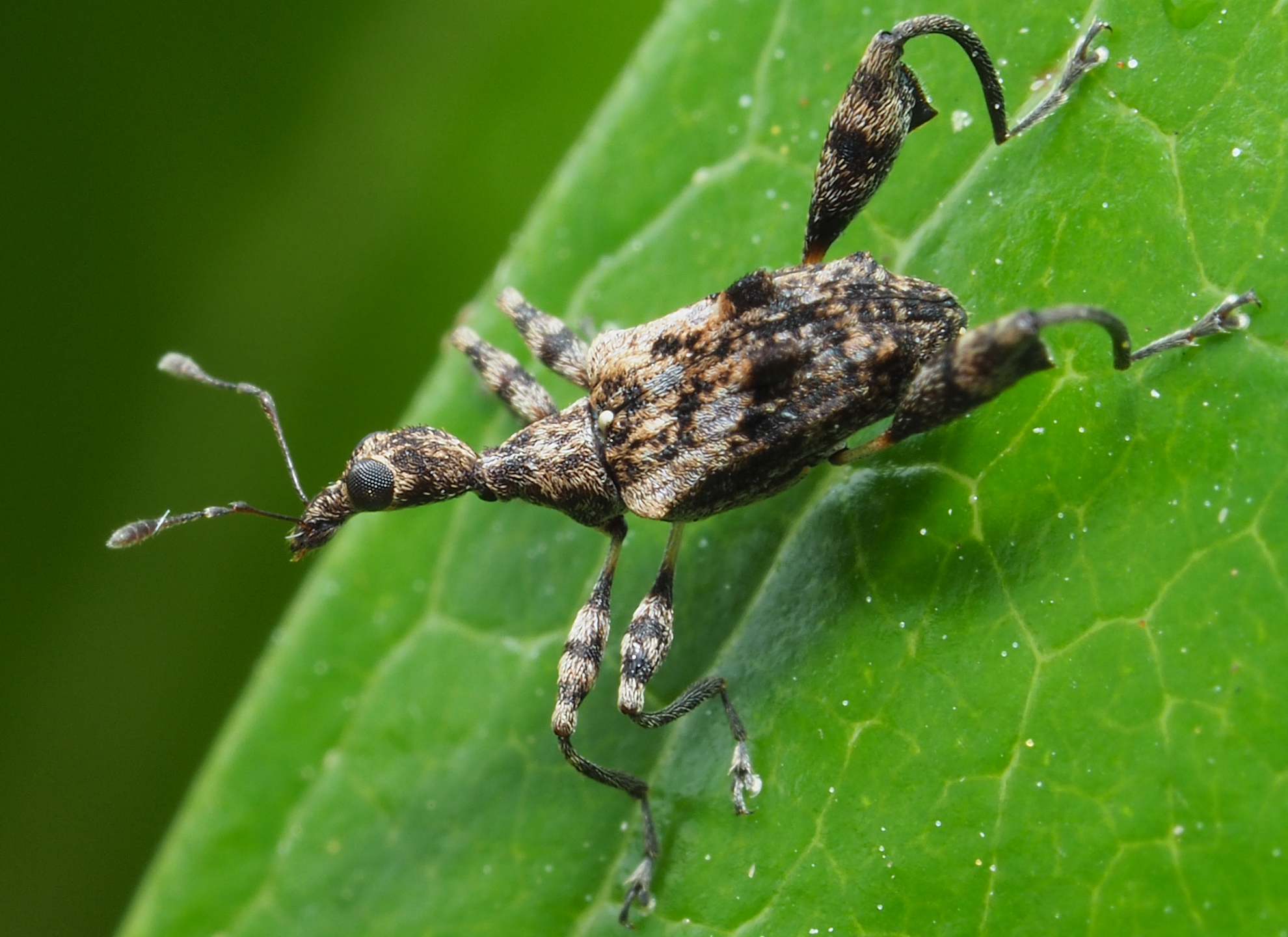
- Moanus lawsoni

Scientific classification
- Kingdom: Animalia
- Phylum: Arthropoda
- Class: Insecta
- Order: Coleoptera
- Suborder: Polyphaga
- Infraorder: Cucujiformia
- Family: Curculionidae
- Subfamily: Curculioninae
- Tribe: Eugnomini
- Subtribe: Eugnomina
- Genus: Moanus; Mazur & Brown, 2024

Type species
- Stephanorhynchus lawsoni Sharp, 1876

= Moanus =

Genus of New Zealand weevils

Moanus is a genus of flower weevils endemic to New Zealand.

== Description ==
Moanus weevils can be distinguished from those of related genera by their distinctly elongated legs and a head that is longer than or equal in length to the rostrum. In males, the aedeagus (reproductive organ) is symmetrical. The weevils are generally patchy black, brown, and beige in colour. They have been collected from a variety of plants.

== Distribution ==
Moanus brevipennis, M. nigrosparsus, and M. tumulus are only found on the South Island; M. lawsoni is found on the North, South, and Mangere (Chathams) islands.

== Taxonomy ==
The genus was erected in 2024, to include species previously classified in Stephanorhynchus. Moanus includes the following species:

- Moanus brevipennis (Pascoe, 1876)
  (=) Stephanorhynchus griseipictus Broun, 1886
- Moanus lawsoni (Sharp, 1876)
- Moanus nigrosparsus (Broun, 1893)
  (=) Stephanorhynchus pygmaeus Broun, 1903
- Moantus tumulus Mazur & Brown, 2024

The name, Moanus, is a Latinization of a Māori word, moana, or 'ocean', in reference to a swirling pattern of scales on the elytra.
