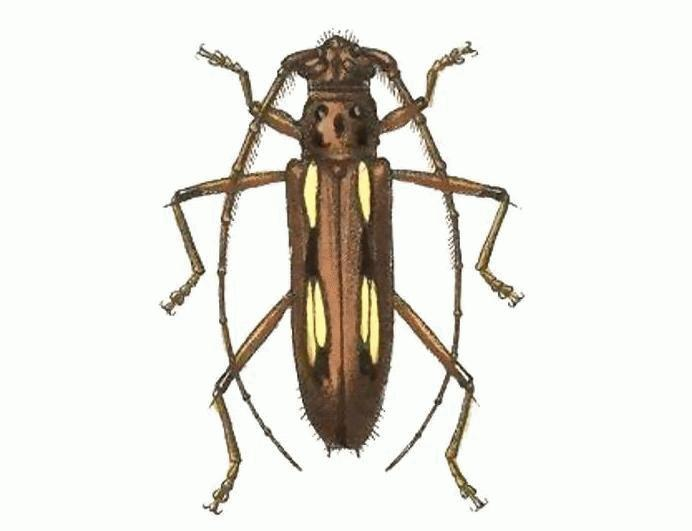

Scientific classification
- Kingdom: Animalia
- Phylum: Arthropoda
- Class: Insecta
- Order: Coleoptera
- Suborder: Polyphaga
- Infraorder: Cucujiformia
- Family: Cerambycidae
- Genus: Eburodacrys
- Species: E. sticticollis

Binomial name
- Eburodacrys sticticollis Bates, 1874

= Eburodacrys sticticollis =

Species of beetle

Eburodacrys sticticollis is a species of beetle in the family Cerambycidae. It was described by Bates in 1874.
