= Eburodacrys errata =

Scientific classification
- Kingdom: Animalia
- Phylum: Arthropoda
- Class: Insecta
- Order: Coleoptera
- Suborder: Polyphaga
- Infraorder: Cucujiformia
- Family: Cerambycidae
- Genus: Eburodacrys
- Species: E. errata

Binomial name
- Eburodacrys errata Galileo & Martins, 2010

Species of beetle

Eburodacrys errata is a species of beetle in the family Cerambycidae. It was described by Galileo and Martins in 2010.
