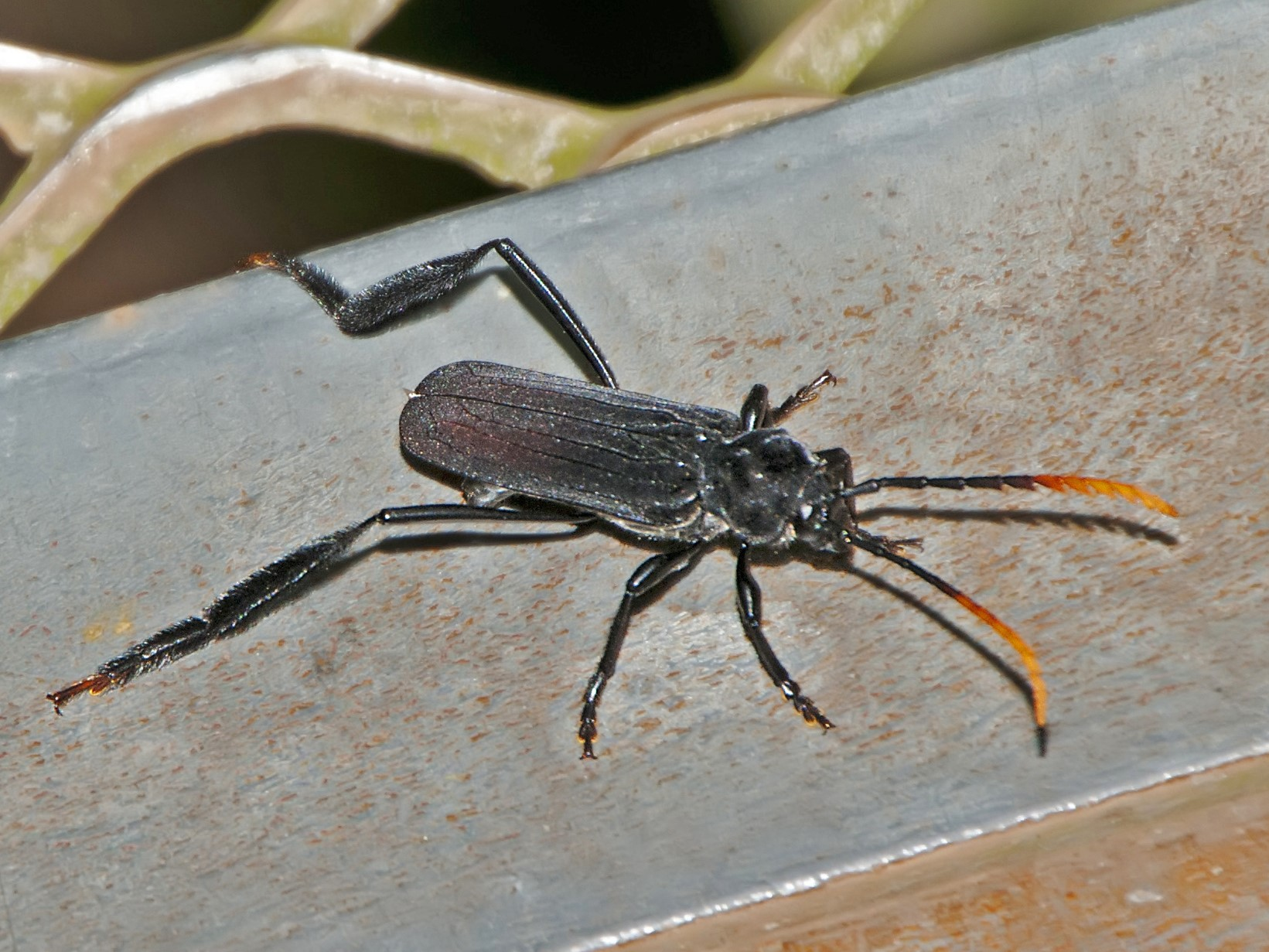
- Polyschisis melanaria

Scientific classification
- Kingdom: Animalia
- Phylum: Arthropoda
- Class: Insecta
- Order: Coleoptera
- Suborder: Polyphaga
- Infraorder: Cucujiformia
- Family: Cerambycidae
- Subfamily: Cerambycinae
- Tribe: Trachyderini
- Genus: Polyschisis; Audinet-Serville, 1833

= Polyschisis =

Genus of beetles

Polyschisis is a genus of longhorn beetles in the family Cerambycidae, containing the following species:

- Polyschisis hirtipes (Olivier, 1792)
- Polyschisis melanaria White, 1853
- Polyschisis rufitarsalis Waterhouse, 1880
- Polyschisis tucumana Di Iorio, 2003
