= Polyschisis hirtipes =

Scientific classification
- Kingdom: Animalia
- Phylum: Arthropoda
- Clade: Pancrustacea
- Class: Insecta
- Order: Coleoptera
- Suborder: Polyphaga
- Infraorder: Cucujiformia
- Family: Cerambycidae
- Genus: Polyschisis
- Species: P. hirtipes

Binomial name
- Polyschisis hirtipes (Olivier, 1792)

Species of beetle

Polyschisis hirtipes is a species of beetle in the family Cerambycidae. It was described by Olivier in 1792.
