= Eburodacrys amazonica =

Scientific classification
- Kingdom: Animalia
- Phylum: Arthropoda
- Class: Insecta
- Order: Coleoptera
- Suborder: Polyphaga
- Infraorder: Cucujiformia
- Family: Cerambycidae
- Genus: Eburodacrys
- Species: E. amazonica

Binomial name
- Eburodacrys amazonica Melzer, 1927

Species of beetle

Eburodacrys amazonica is a species of beetle in the family Cerambycidae.
