= Eburodacrys silviamariae =

Scientific classification
- Kingdom: Animalia
- Phylum: Arthropoda
- Class: Insecta
- Order: Coleoptera
- Suborder: Polyphaga
- Infraorder: Cucujiformia
- Family: Cerambycidae
- Genus: Eburodacrys
- Species: E. silviamariae

Binomial name
- Eburodacrys silviamariae Galileo & Martins, 2006

Species of beetle

Eburodacrys silviamariae is a species of beetle in the family Cerambycidae. It was described by Galileo and Martins in 2006.
