= Eburodacrys quadridens =

Scientific classification
- Kingdom: Animalia
- Phylum: Arthropoda
- Class: Insecta
- Order: Coleoptera
- Suborder: Polyphaga
- Infraorder: Cucujiformia
- Family: Cerambycidae
- Genus: Eburodacrys
- Species: E. quadridens

Binomial name
- Eburodacrys quadridens (Fabricius, 1801)

Species of beetle

Eburodacrys quadridens is a species of beetle in the family Cerambycidae. It was described by Johan Christian Fabricius in 1801.
