= Polyschisis tucumana =

Scientific classification
- Domain: Eukaryota
- Kingdom: Animalia
- Phylum: Arthropoda
- Class: Insecta
- Order: Coleoptera
- Suborder: Polyphaga
- Infraorder: Cucujiformia
- Family: Cerambycidae
- Genus: Polyschisis
- Species: P. tucumana

Binomial name
- Polyschisis tucumana Di Iorio, 2003

Species of beetle

Polyschisis tucumana is a species of beetle in the family Cerambycidae. It was described by Di Iorio in 2003.
