= Eburodacrys trilineata =

Scientific classification
- Kingdom: Animalia
- Phylum: Arthropoda
- Class: Insecta
- Order: Coleoptera
- Suborder: Polyphaga
- Infraorder: Cucujiformia
- Family: Cerambycidae
- Genus: Eburodacrys
- Species: E. trilineata

Binomial name
- Eburodacrys trilineata (Aurivillius, 1893)

Species of beetle

Eburodacrys trilineata is a species of beetle in the family Cerambycidae. It was described by Per Olof Christopher Aurivillius in 1893.
