= Eburodacrys pilicornis =

Scientific classification
- Kingdom: Animalia
- Phylum: Arthropoda
- Class: Insecta
- Order: Coleoptera
- Suborder: Polyphaga
- Infraorder: Cucujiformia
- Family: Cerambycidae
- Genus: Eburodacrys
- Species: E. pilicornis

Binomial name
- Eburodacrys pilicornis Fisher, 1944

Species of beetle

Eburodacrys pilicornis is a species of beetle in the family Cerambycidae. It was described by Fisher in 1944.
