= Eburodacrys gaucha =

Scientific classification
- Kingdom: Animalia
- Phylum: Arthropoda
- Class: Insecta
- Order: Coleoptera
- Suborder: Polyphaga
- Infraorder: Cucujiformia
- Family: Cerambycidae
- Genus: Eburodacrys
- Species: E. gaucha

Binomial name
- Eburodacrys gaucha Galileo & Martins, 1992

Species of beetle

Eburodacrys gaucha is a species of beetle in the family Cerambycidae. It was described by Galileo and Martins in 1992.
