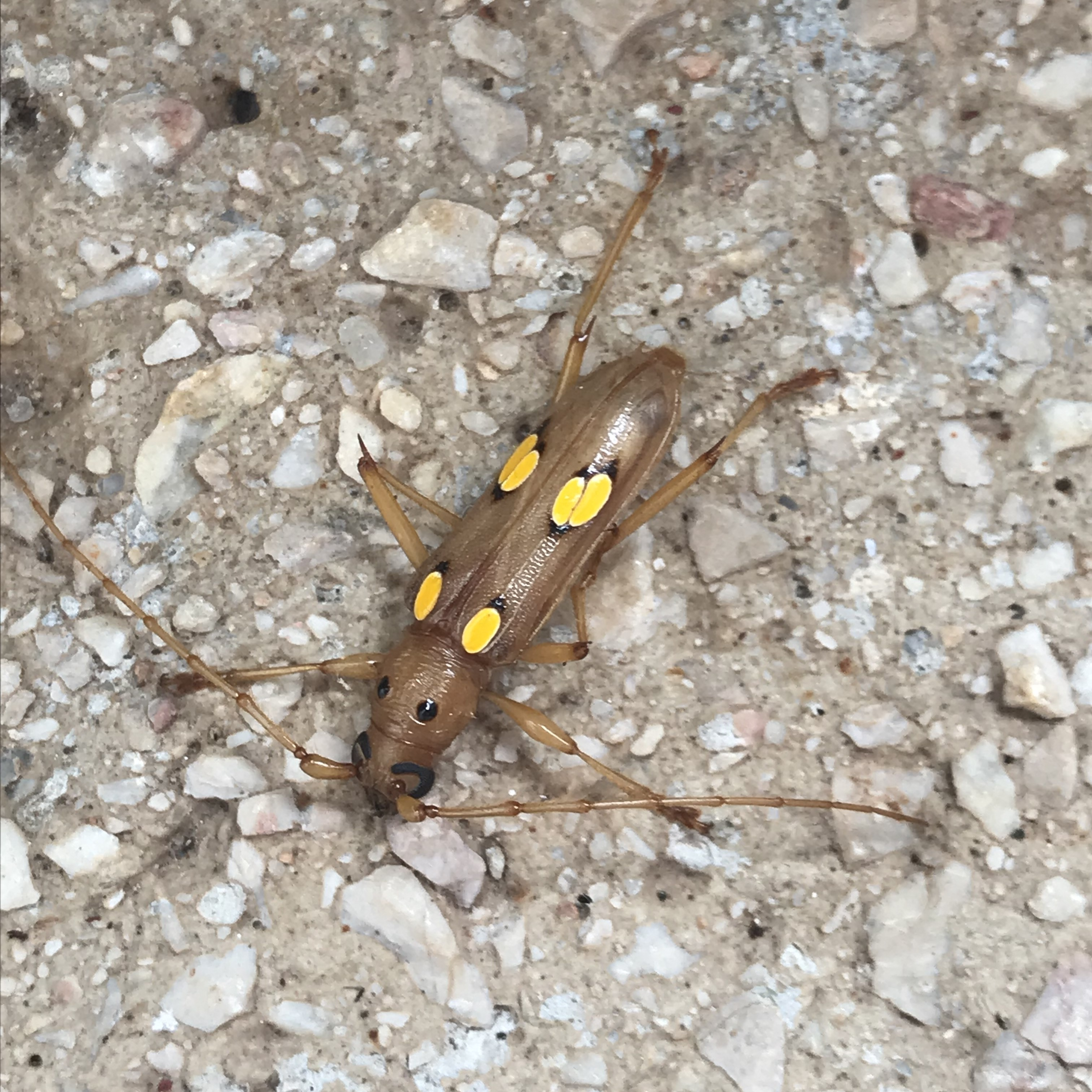

Scientific classification
- Kingdom: Animalia
- Phylum: Arthropoda
- Class: Insecta
- Order: Coleoptera
- Suborder: Polyphaga
- Infraorder: Cucujiformia
- Family: Cerambycidae
- Genus: Eburodacrys
- Species: E. laevicornis

Binomial name
- Eburodacrys laevicornis Bates, 1884

= Eburodacrys laevicornis =

Species of beetle

Eburodacrys laevicornis is a species of beetle in the family Cerambycidae. It was described by Henry Walter Bates in 1884.
