= Polyschisis rufitarsalis =

Scientific classification
- Domain: Eukaryota
- Kingdom: Animalia
- Phylum: Arthropoda
- Class: Insecta
- Order: Coleoptera
- Suborder: Polyphaga
- Infraorder: Cucujiformia
- Family: Cerambycidae
- Genus: Polyschisis
- Species: P. rufitarsalis

Binomial name
- Polyschisis rufitarsalis Waterhouse, 1880

Species of beetle

Polyschisis rufitarsalis is a species of beetle in the family Cerambycidae. It was described by Waterhouse in 1880.
