= Eburodacrys vidua =

Scientific classification
- Kingdom: Animalia
- Phylum: Arthropoda
- Class: Insecta
- Order: Coleoptera
- Suborder: Polyphaga
- Infraorder: Cucujiformia
- Family: Cerambycidae
- Genus: Eburodacrys
- Species: E. vidua

Binomial name
- Eburodacrys vidua (Lacordaire, 1869)

Species of beetle

Eburodacrys vidua is a species of beetle in the family Cerambycidae. It was described by Lacordaire in 1869.
