= Eburodacrys sexguttata =

Scientific classification
- Kingdom: Animalia
- Phylum: Arthropoda
- Class: Insecta
- Order: Coleoptera
- Suborder: Polyphaga
- Infraorder: Cucujiformia
- Family: Cerambycidae
- Genus: Eburodacrys
- Species: E. sexguttata

Binomial name
- Eburodacrys sexguttata Lameere, 1884

Species of beetle

Eburodacrys sexguttata is a species of beetle in the family Cerambycidae. It was described by Lameere in 1884.
