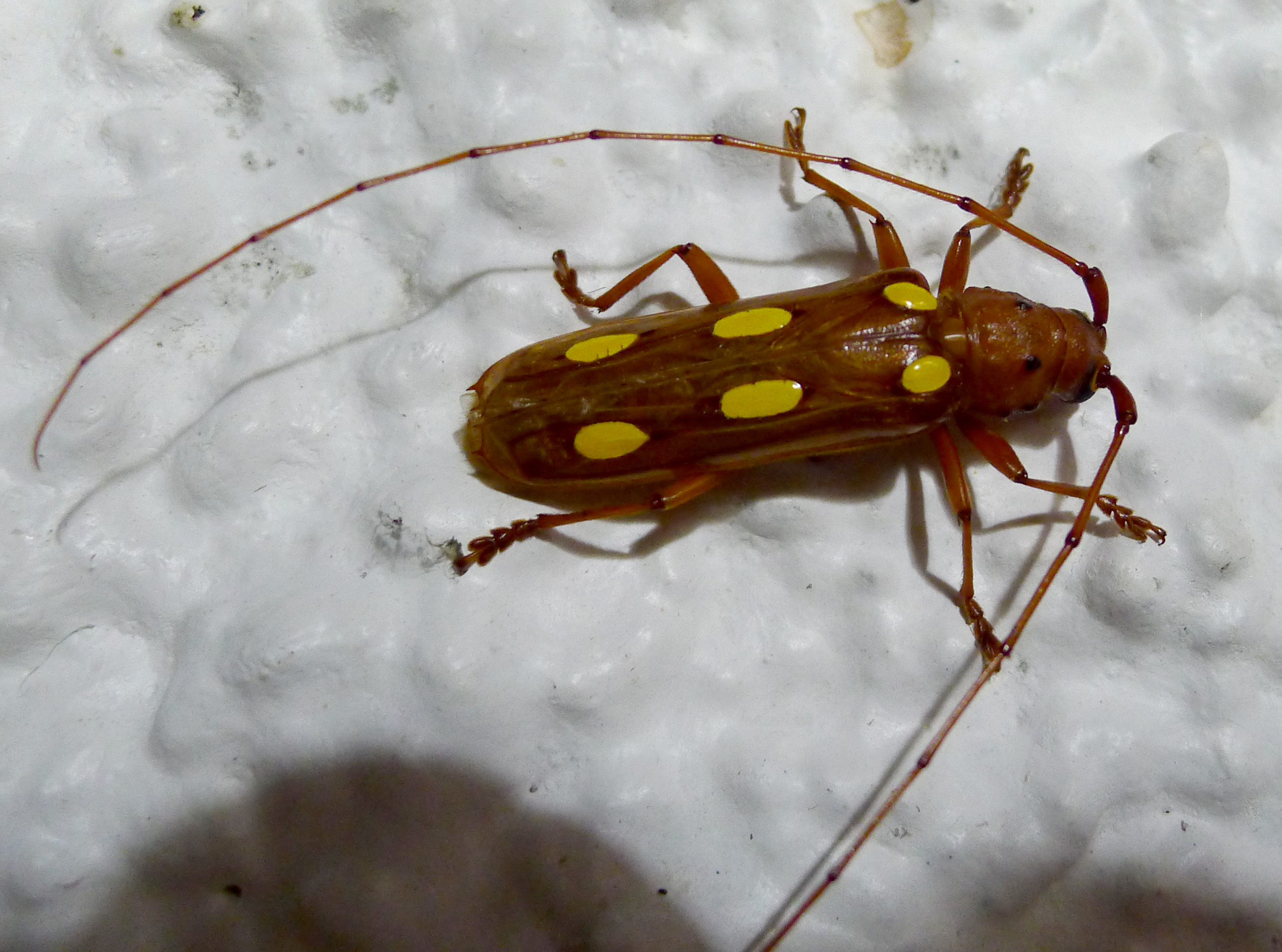

Scientific classification
- Kingdom: Animalia
- Phylum: Arthropoda
- Class: Insecta
- Order: Coleoptera
- Suborder: Polyphaga
- Infraorder: Cucujiformia
- Family: Cerambycidae
- Genus: Eburodacrys
- Species: E. triocellata

Binomial name
- Eburodacrys triocellata (Stål, 1857)

= Eburodacrys triocellata =

Species of beetle

Eburodacrys triocellata is a species of beetle in the family Cerambycidae. It was described by Carl Stål in 1857.
