= Eburodacrys separata =

Scientific classification
- Kingdom: Animalia
- Phylum: Arthropoda
- Class: Insecta
- Order: Coleoptera
- Suborder: Polyphaga
- Infraorder: Cucujiformia
- Family: Cerambycidae
- Genus: Eburodacrys
- Species: E. separata

Binomial name
- Eburodacrys separata Martins, Galileo & Oliveira, 2011

Species of beetle

Eburodacrys separata is a species of beetle in the family Cerambycidae. It was described by Martins, Galileo and Oliveira in 2011.
