= Eburodacrys alini =

Scientific classification
- Kingdom: Animalia
- Phylum: Arthropoda
- Clade: Pancrustacea
- Class: Insecta
- Order: Coleoptera
- Suborder: Polyphaga
- Infraorder: Cucujiformia
- Family: Cerambycidae
- Genus: Eburodacrys
- Species: E. alini

Binomial name
- Eburodacrys alini Napp & Martins, 1980

Species of beetle

Eburodacrys alini is a species of beetle in the family Cerambycidae.
