= Eburodacrys rhabdota =

Scientific classification
- Kingdom: Animalia
- Phylum: Arthropoda
- Class: Insecta
- Order: Coleoptera
- Suborder: Polyphaga
- Infraorder: Cucujiformia
- Family: Cerambycidae
- Genus: Eburodacrys
- Species: E. rhabdota

Binomial name
- Eburodacrys rhabdota Martins, 1967

Species of beetle

Eburodacrys rhabdota is a species of beetle in the family Cerambycidae. It was described by Martins in 1967.
