= Eburodacrys lenkoi =

Scientific classification
- Kingdom: Animalia
- Phylum: Arthropoda
- Class: Insecta
- Order: Coleoptera
- Suborder: Polyphaga
- Infraorder: Cucujiformia
- Family: Cerambycidae
- Genus: Eburodacrys
- Species: E. lenkoi

Binomial name
- Eburodacrys lenkoi Napp & Martins, 1980

Species of beetle

Eburodacrys lenkoi is a species of beetle in the family Cerambycidae. It was described by Napp and Martins in 1980.
