= Eburodacrys truncata =

Scientific classification
- Kingdom: Animalia
- Phylum: Arthropoda
- Class: Insecta
- Order: Coleoptera
- Suborder: Polyphaga
- Infraorder: Cucujiformia
- Family: Cerambycidae
- Genus: Eburodacrys
- Species: E. truncata

Binomial name
- Eburodacrys truncata E. Fuchs, 1956

Species of beetle

Eburodacrys truncata is a species of beetle in the family Cerambycidae. It was described by Ernst Fuchs in 1956.
