= Adam White (zoologist) =

Scottish zoologist (1817–1878)

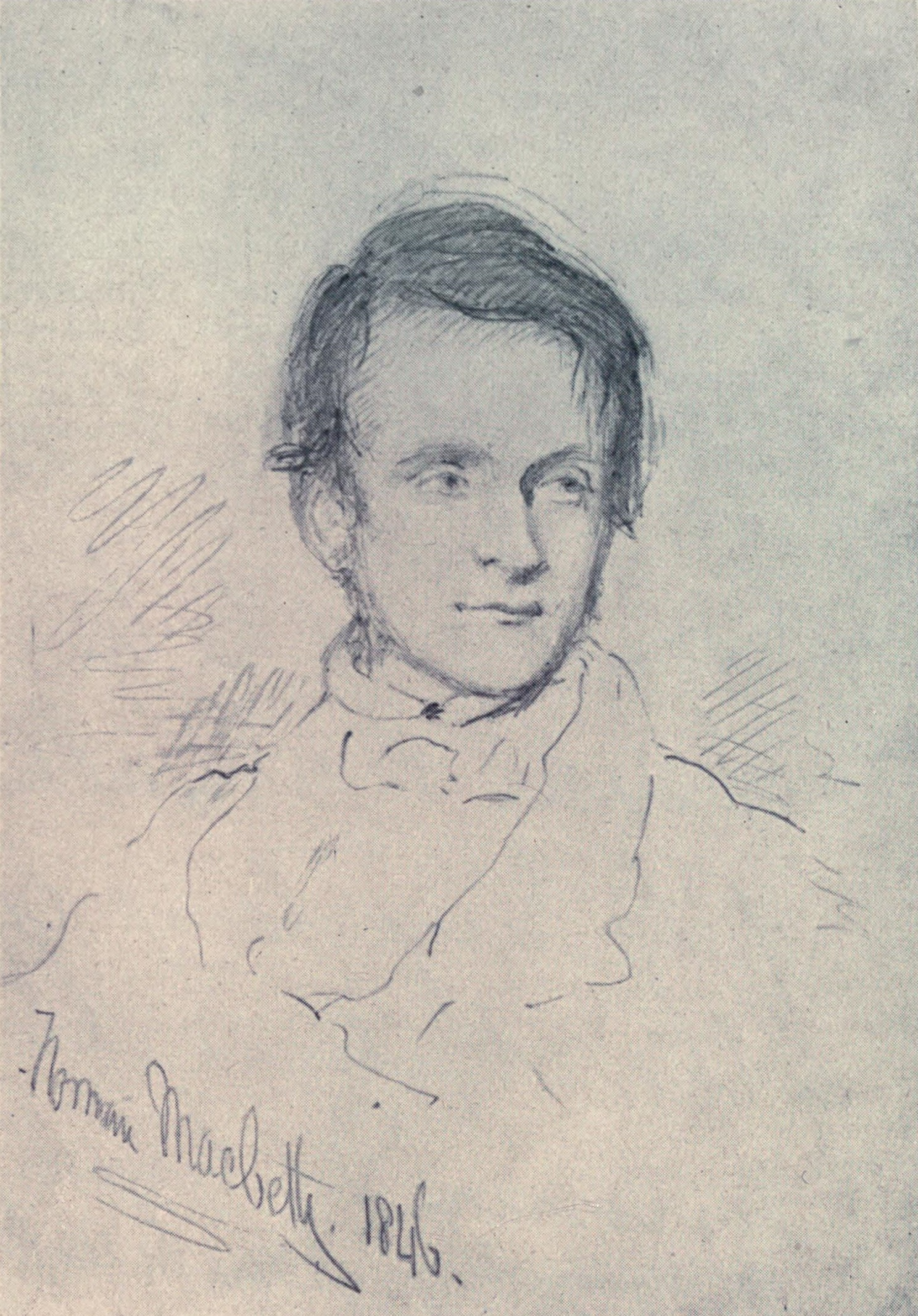
- Portrait by Norman Macbeth, 1846.
- Born: 29 April 1817; Edinburgh
- Died: 30 December 1878 (aged 61)
- Resting place: Pollokshields
- Scientific career
- Fields: Entomology, carcinology
- Institutions: British Museum

Adam White (29 April 1817 – 30 December 1878) was a Scottish zoologist.

== Biography ==
White was born in Edinburgh on 29 April 1817. He became acquainted with John Edward Gray, Keeper of Zoology at the British Museum. At the age of eighteen, White obtained a post in the Museum in the Zoology Department. In 1841 he was given the task of identifying and publishing the spiders collected by Charles Darwin on the Voyage of the Beagle and "preserved in spirits of wine, as spiders should always be if possible". This work was published as Description of new or little known Arachnida.

White specialised in insects and crustaceans, writing the List of the Specimens of Crustacea in the British Museum (1847) and A Popular History of Mammalia (1850). White was a member of the Entomological Society of London from 1839 to 1863, and a Fellow of the Linnean Society from 1846 to 1855.

White suffered a nervous breakdown after the death of his first wife in 1861. He remarried in 1862, and had at least three children by his second wife. He died intestate in Pollokshields on 30 December 1878.

== Species named in White's honour ==
John Obadiah Westwood named the insect species Taphroderes whitii in White's honour, after White pointed a specimen of that same insect out to Westwood during a visit to the British Museum.

== Selected works ==
- Adam White (1841). "Appendix F. Notes on some insects from King George's Sound". In G. Grey (ed.). Journals of Two Expeditions of Discovery in North-West and Western Australia. Vol. 2. London: T. & W. Boone. pp. 450–456.
- Adam White (1844). "Descriptions of some new species of Coleoptera and Homoptera from China". Annals and Magazine of Natural History. 1 (14): 422–426.
- Adam White (1844). "Description of some coleopterous insects in the collection of the British Museum apparently unnoticed". Proceedings of the Zoological Society of London. 24: 8–17, 406–410.
- Adam White (1846). "Insects of New Zealand". In J. Richardson & J. E. Gray (ed.). The Zoology of the Voyage of H.M.S. Erebus & Terror under Command of Captain Sir J. C. Ross, during the years 1839–1843. Vol. 2. London: E. W. Janson. pp. 1–51.
- Adam White (1847). "Cetoniadae". Nomenclature of Coleopterous Insects in the Collection of the British Museum. London: Spottiswoode & Shaw. pp. 1–56.
- Adam White (1859). "Spicilegia Entomologica. IV. Diagnoses Coleopterorum quatuor". Annals and Magazine of Natural History. 3 (3): 290–291.
- Adam White (1859). "Descriptions of unrecorded species of Australian Coleoptera of the families Carabidae, Buprestidae, Lamellicornia, Longicornia etc". Proceedings of the Zoological Society of London. 1859: 117–123.
