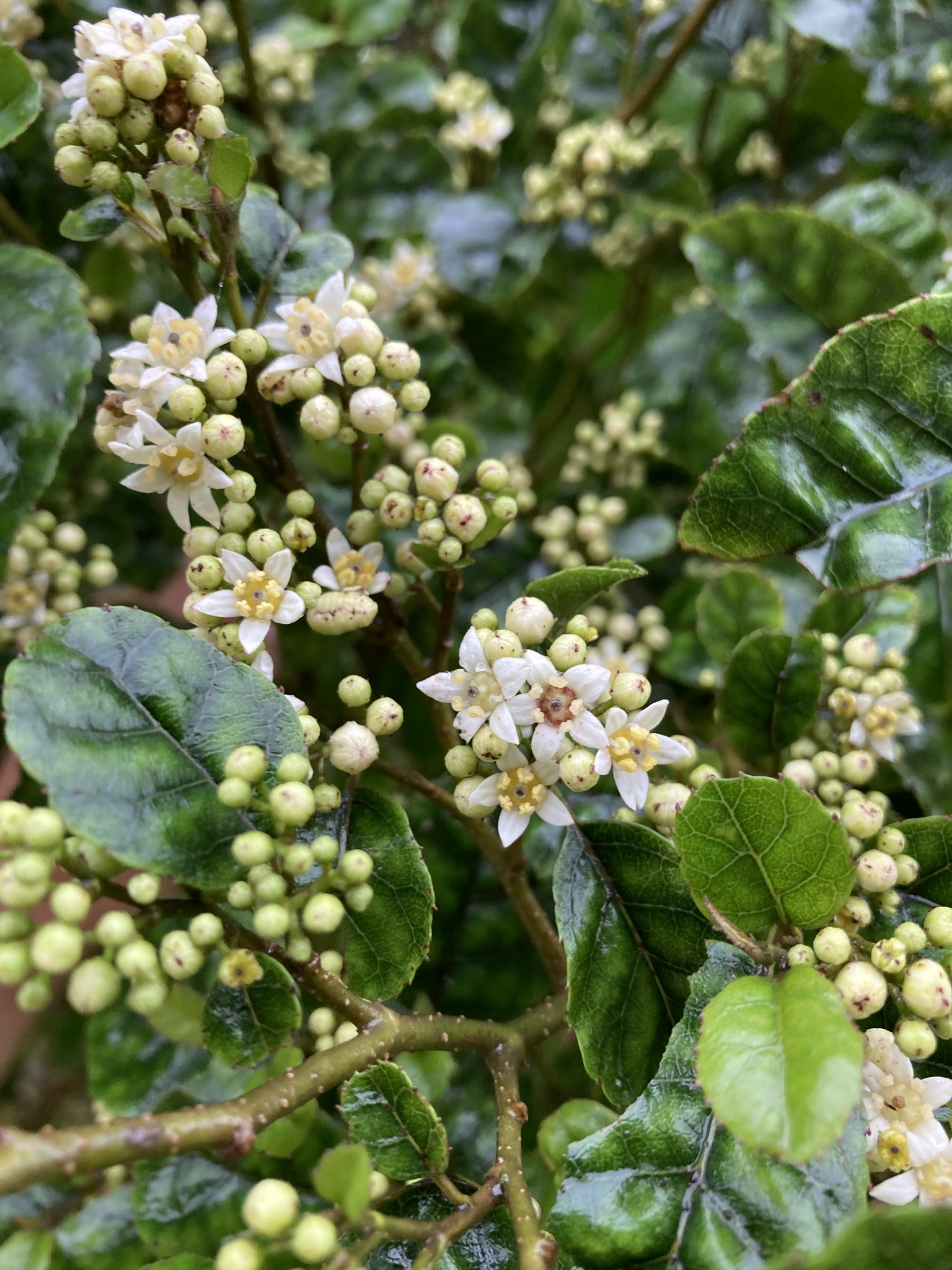
- Carpodetus serratus in flower

Conservation status
- Not Threatened (NZ TCS)

Scientific classification
- Kingdom: Plantae
- Clade: Tracheophytes
- Clade: Angiosperms
- Clade: Eudicots
- Clade: Asterids
- Order: Asterales
- Family: Rousseaceae
- Genus: Carpodetus
- Species: C. serratus

Binomial name
- Carpodetus serratus J.R.Forst & G.Forst.

Synonyms
- Carpodetus dentatus Poir.; Carpodetus forsteri Schult.

= Carpodetus serratus =

Species of flowering plant

Carpodetus serratus, commonly known as marbleleaf and putaputawētā, is a species of tree in the family Rousseaceae. It is endemic to New Zealand; its range mainly covers the North, South, and Stewart Islands. The species is commonly found on river banks and the margins of forests. It is a monoecious tree reaching up to 10 metres (30 feet) in height. Its young stage resembles a divaricating tangled shrub with branchlets arranged in a zig-zag pattern.

Carpodetus serratus was first described in 1776 by the German naturalists Georg and Johann Reinhold Forster. Pollination is likely achieved by insects, but the tree is potentially capable of self-pollination. The tree often has holes in the trunk which is a result of being tunnelled by pūriri moths (Aenetus virescens). These tunnels are then inhabited by wētā, hence the Māori name putaputawētā referring to many wētā emerging. European settlers valued the tree, the wood had multiple uses as timber, and the flowers were a competitor to being the country's national flower. In 2023, the conservation status of the tree was assessed as "Not Threatened" in the New Zealand Threat Classification System.

== Description ==
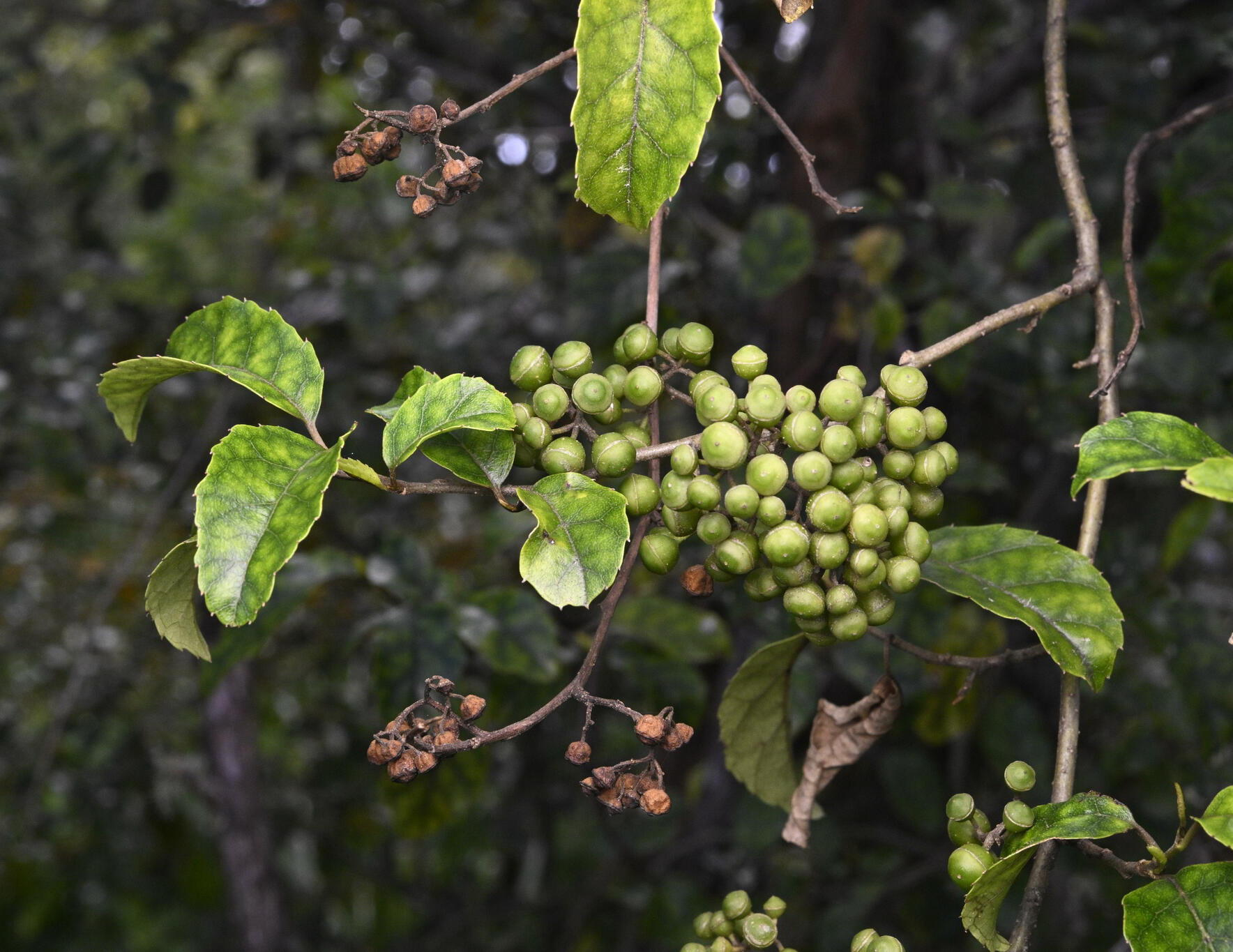
Fruits of Carpodetus serratus

Carpodetus serratus (putaputawētā) is a species of monoecious in the family Rousseaceae. The tree reaches up to 10 metres (30 feet) in height. The trunk is slender, up to 20 cm (8 in) wide, and the bark is corky, mottled, grey-white in colour, and often knobbly as a result of insect tunnelling. The wood is white and is open in the grain.

Juvenile C. serratus plants exhibit a divaricating tangled shrub characteristic with branchlets arranged in a zig-zag pattern. Leaves are marbled (hence the common name), ovate to nearly round in character, dark green in colour, thin, slightly leathery, and the margins are finely toothed. C. serratus exhibits heteroblasty in leaf and branch form. Juvenile leaves are 10–30 mm × 10–20 mm long. Adult leaves are 40–60 mm × 20–30 mm long. The petioles are about 10 mm long.

Flowers are arranged in panicles at the ends of the branchlets. Flowering occurs from November to March. These panicles can reach up to 50 × 50 mm long and the flowers can reach 5–6 mm in diameter. The petals are white, ovate, and 3–4 mm long. The stigma is cap-shaped with a dark tip. Fruits are found in capsules, 4–6 mm long, and black at maturity. January and February appear to be the fruiting season, although dried fruit can be present throughout the year as they may take a year to mature. The seeds are small, only about 1–2 mm long.

Carpodetus serratus contains several chemical compounds, including, kaempferol, leucodelphinidin, polyphenols, quercetin, as well as the triterpene lupeol. C. serratus has a diploid chromosome count of 30.

== Taxonomy ==
Carpodetus serratus was first described in 1776 by the German naturalists Georg and Johann Reinhold Forster. Carpodetus has been included in several different families, including, Saxifragaceae, Escalloniaceae, and Rousseaceae (which is the current accepted family). C. serratus has two synonyms, C. dentatus and C. forsteri, described by Jean Louis Marie Poiret and Josef August Schultes, respectively. There are eleven species of the Carpodetus genus currently accepted by the Plants of the World Online taxonomic database. These species are native to islands in the Pacific: New Guinea, New Zealand, the Solomon Islands, and Vanuatu.

=== Etymology ===
The etymology of C. serratus's genus name, Carpodetus, comes from the Greek καρπο-δέτης which means 'bound-fruit' or 'fruit bound together'. The specific epithet (second part of the scientific name), serratus, means 'saw-toothed'. The species is commonly known as marbleleaf, putaputawētā, and piripiriwhata. The New Zealand botanist Thomas Kirk noted in his 1889 revision of the New Zealand flora that European settlers referred to the tree as 'mapau', 'white mapau', 'white maple', and 'white birch'.

== Ecology ==
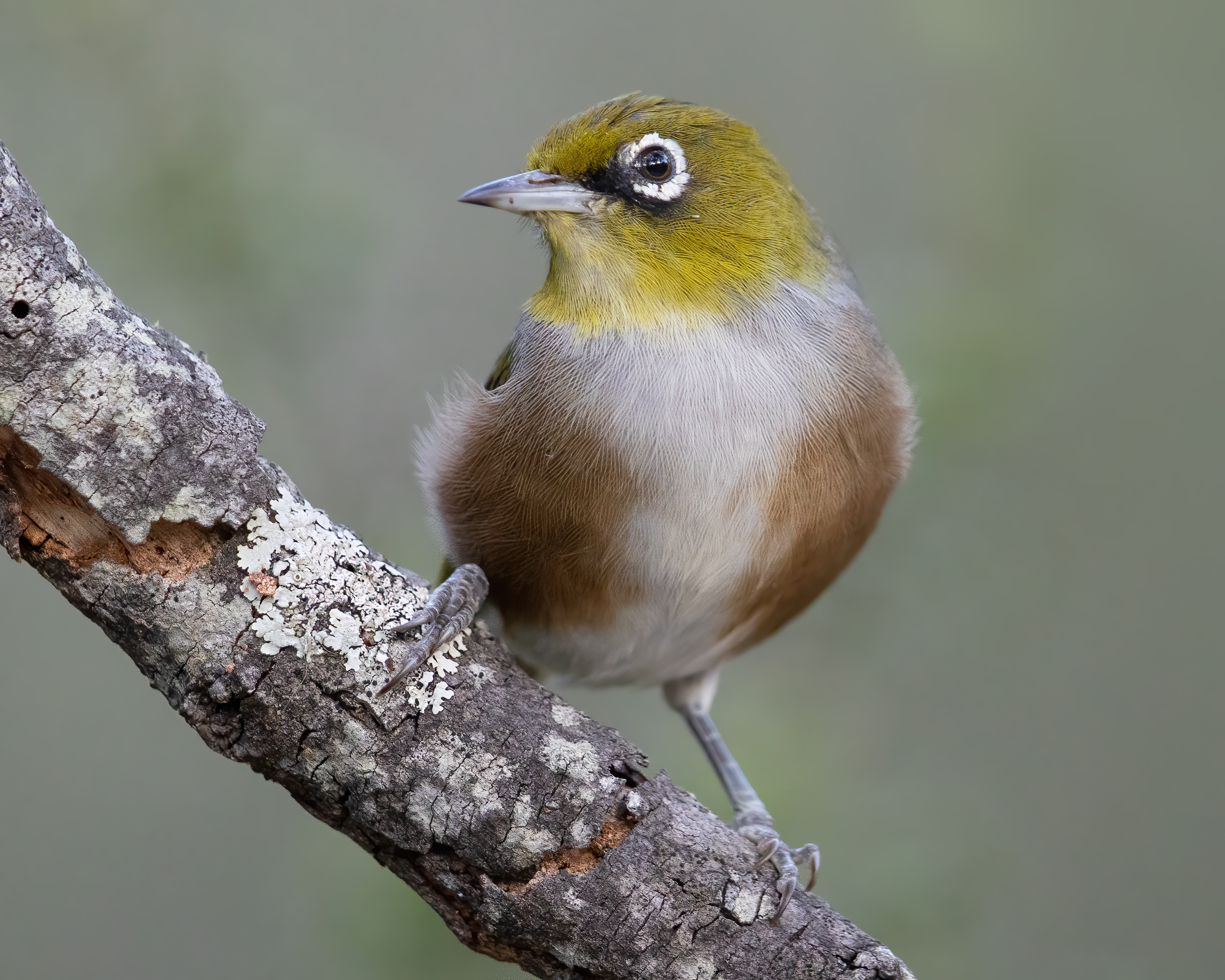
The native silvereye bird consumes the fruits of C. serratus.

The fruits are dispersed by fruit-eating animals (frugivores), such as birds. Burrows (1996) recorded that C. serratus fruits were consumed by silvereyes (Zosterops lateralis). The fruits are also eaten by New Zealand bellbirds (Anthornis melanura) and North Island kōkako (Callaeas wilsoni), which compete for the fruits from possums. The divaricating tangled characteristic of the tree may have prevented the leaves from being eaten by the extinct moa, but the fruits were eaten by them. The kererū (Hemiphaga novaeseelandiae) eats both the fruits and leaves.

The tree trunks are often tunnelled by the caterpillars of the pūriri moths (Aenetus virescens). After abandoning these holes that the caterpillars produce, the holes are then inhabited by wētā or tunnelweb spiders (Porrhothele antipodiana). Caterpillars of the forest semilooper moths (Declana floccosa) are also hosted on the leaves. Several genera of gall midges have been found to be hosted on the tree. C. serratus also plays host to Meterana ochthistis and Tetrorea cilipes. The native mistletoe, tāpia (Tupeia antarctica), can be present parasitically on the tree. C. serratus has low flammability rates.

=== Pollination ===
Carpodetus serratus is monoecious, meaning individual trees are either hermaphroditic or female. The white petals of the tree have a sweet scent, which is believed to attract insects for pollination. George Thomson, a botanist, reported in an 1881 source that C. serratus is pollinated by insects entirely. Another source from 2007 noted introduced and native bees, from the genus Leioproctus, as visitors to the flowers. In 1978, the botanist Brenda Shore experimented pollinating flowers by hand, and concluded bisexual flowers are potentially capable of producing seeds from self-pollination.

== Distribution ==
Carpodetus serratus is endemic to New Zealand; its range mainly covers the North, South, and Stewart Islands. Despite its widespread distribution throughout the country, the plant rarely occurs in large quantities. The genus Carpodetus was thought to be restricted to New Zealand, but other species have since been discovered in Papuasia, Solomon Islands, and Vanuatu. The northern limit of C. serratus is either Mangōnui or Cape Reinga (in the North Island). The southern limit is Stewart Island. The 2023 assessment of C. serratus in the New Zealand Threat Classification System was "Not Threatened".

=== Habitat ===
Carpodetus serratus typically inhabits coastal to montane environments, reaching 1,200 metres (4,000 feet) above sea level at maximum altitude. It is commonly found in broadleaf forests, southern beech (Nothofagus) forests, and commonly occurs as part of secondary forest. It inhabits streamsides and forest margins. C. serratus grows best in areas with variable light. C. serratus commonly associates with wineberry (Aristotelia serrata). C. serratus is moderately frost-resistant and can withstand dry soils, although it prefers to grow in soils that are deep and well-drained.

== Uses ==
Carpodetus serratus has several Māori names, including, kai-wētā, putaputawētā, punawētā, putāwētā, piripiriwhata, and piripiri wata. The name putaputawētā refers to many wētā emerging. Other variations of the name of the plant often refer to wētā, or spleenworts of the genus Asplenium, which is piripiri in Māori. The wood of C. serratus is white and open in the grain. Evidence presented by museum artefacts suggest a teka (footrest) was made from C. serratus wood.

The timber is not suitable for sawmilling, although it did have uses in cabinetmaking and for handles of axes and other tools. It has also been used for fence nails and other similar purposes. The wood is not durable when it is in contact with the ground. The wood contains too much sap to be suitable for use as firewood, which earned it the nickname "bucket-of-water tree", a name shared with kōtukutuku (Fuchsia excorticata) and rewarewa (Knightia excelsa). The New Zealand botanist Leonard Cockayne believed that the flowers of C. serratus were a strong competitor to being the country's national flower.

== Works cited ==
Books

- Crowe, Andrew (2009). Which Native Tree? New Zealand Native Trees: A Simple Guide to their Identification, Ecology and Uses. Auckland, New Zealand: Penguin Books. ISBN 978-0-14-300899-6.
- Dawson, John; Lucas, Rob (2011). Field Guide to New Zealand's Native Trees. Nelson, New Zealand: Potton & Burton. ISBN 978-1-877517-01-3.
- Garnock-Jones, Philip (2025). He Puāwai. Auckland, New Zealand: Auckland University Press. ISBN 978-1-77671-168-0.
- Gledhill, David (6 March 2008). The Names of Plants. Cambridge, United Kingdom: Cambridge University Press. ISBN 978-0-521-68553-5.
- Kirk, Thomas (1889). The Forest Flora of New Zealand. Wellington, New Zealand: George Didsbury – via the Internet Archive.
- Wardle, J. (2011). Wardle's Native Plants of New Zealand and Their Story. Bateson Publishing Limited. ISBN 9781877520068.

Journals

- Burrows, C. J. (1996). "Germination Behaviour of the Seeds of Seven New Zealand Woody Plant Species". New Zealand Journal of Botany. 34 (3): 355–367. doi:10.1080/0028825X.1996.10410700. ISSN 0028-825X.
- Day, Jamie S. (1998). "Growth and Architecture of Juvenile Carpodetus serratus in Closed Forest Canopy and Canopy Gap Environments". New Zealand Journal of Botany. 36 (3): 485–493. doi:10.1080/0028825X.1998.9512587. ISSN 0028-825X.
- Hunt, G. R. (1992). "Life Cycles of a Gall-Forming Gall Midge (Diptera: Cecidomyiidae) and Associated Parasitoids, on Putaputaweta (Carpodetus serratus)". New Zealand Entomologist. 15 (1): 14–21. doi:10.1080/00779962.1992.9722622. ISSN 0077-9962.
- Gaskin, D. E. (1966). "New Zealand Noctuidae (Lepidoptera): Summary of Known Host Plants and a Bibliography Relevant to the Biology of the Group". New Zealand Entomologist. 3 (5): 19–27. doi:10.1080/00779962.1966.9722858. ISSN 0077-9962.
- Gustafsson, M. H. G. (2007). "Flowering Plants | Eudicots". Carpodetaceae: Carpodetaceae Fenzl, Denkschr. Königl.-Baier. Bot. Gesell. Regensburg 3: 155 (1841). Abrophyllaceae Nakai (1943). Berlin, Heidelberg: Springer Berlin Heidelberg. doi:10.1007/978-3-540-31051-8_6. ISBN 978-3-540-31050-1.
- Horrell, Barbara A.; Jameson, Paula E.; Bannister, Peter (1990). "Growth Regulation and Phase Change in Some New Zealand Heteroblastic Plants". New Zealand Journal of Botany. 28 (2): 187–193. doi:10.1080/0028825X.1990.10412357. ISSN 0028-825X.
- Pillon, Y; Hopkins, Hcf; Barrabé, L; Stacy, Ea (2014). "A New Record for Carpodetus (Rousseaceae) in Vanuatu". New Zealand Journal of Botany. 52 (4): 449–452. doi:10.1080/0028825X.2014.928332. ISSN 0028-825X.
- Shore, Brenda F. (1978). "Breeding Systems in Carpodetus serratus J.R. et G.Forst". New Zealand Journal of Botany. 16 (2): 179–184. doi:10.1080/0028825X.1978.10429676. ISSN 0028-825X.
- Townsend, J. I. (1959). "A Record of Sound Produced by the Larvae of Tetrorea cilipes White (Coleoptera: Cerambycidae)". New Zealand Entomologist. 2 (4): 25–27. doi:10.1080/00779962.1959.9722779. ISSN 0077-9962.
- Wehi, Priscilla M.; Brownstein, Gretchen; Morgan‐Richards, Mary (2020). "Indigenous Plant Naming and Experimentation Reveal a Plant–Insect Relationship in New Zealand Forests". Conservation Science and Practice. 2 (10). doi:10.1111/csp2.282. ISSN 2578-4854.

Websites

- De Lange, Peter (2026). "Carpodetus serratus". New Zealand Plant Conservation Network. Archived from the original on 16 September 2025.
- Hall, Nadane (23 June 2015). "10+ Fire-Resistant Shelter Trees". Stuff. Archived from the original on 3 November 2022.
- "Carpodetus J.R.Forst. & G.Forst". Plants of the World Online. Archived from the original on 12 August 2025 – via Royal Botanic Gardens, Kew.
- "Carpodetus serratus J.R.Forst. & G.Forst". Plants of the World Online. Archived from the original on 9 December 2024 – via Royal Botanic Gardens, Kew.
- "Carpodetus serratus J.R.Forst. & G.Forst., Char. Gen. Pl., ed. 2. 34, t. 17 (1776)". The Royal Botanic Gardens, Kew, Harvard University Herbaria & Libraries and Australian National Herbarium. International Plant Names Index. 2026. Archived from the original on 19 August 2024.
- "Ngā Rauropi Whakaoranga — Carpodetus serratus. Putaputawētā". Manaaki Whenua – Landcare Research. 2023. Archived from the original on 9 October 2025.
