= E. pentaphylla =

E. pentaphylla may refer to:

- Ephielis pentaphylla (more commonly referred to as pūriri or vitex lucens), an evergreen tree endemic to New Zealand
- Esenbeckia pentaphylla, a flowering plant
