= Tetrorea discedens =

Scientific classification
- Kingdom: Animalia
- Phylum: Arthropoda
- Class: Insecta
- Order: Coleoptera
- Suborder: Polyphaga
- Infraorder: Cucujiformia
- Family: Cerambycidae
- Genus: Tetrorea
- Species: T. discedens

Binomial name
- Tetrorea discedens Sharp, 1880

Species of beetle

Tetrorea discedens is a species of beetle in the family Cerambycidae. It was described by Sharp in 1880. It is known from New Zealand.
