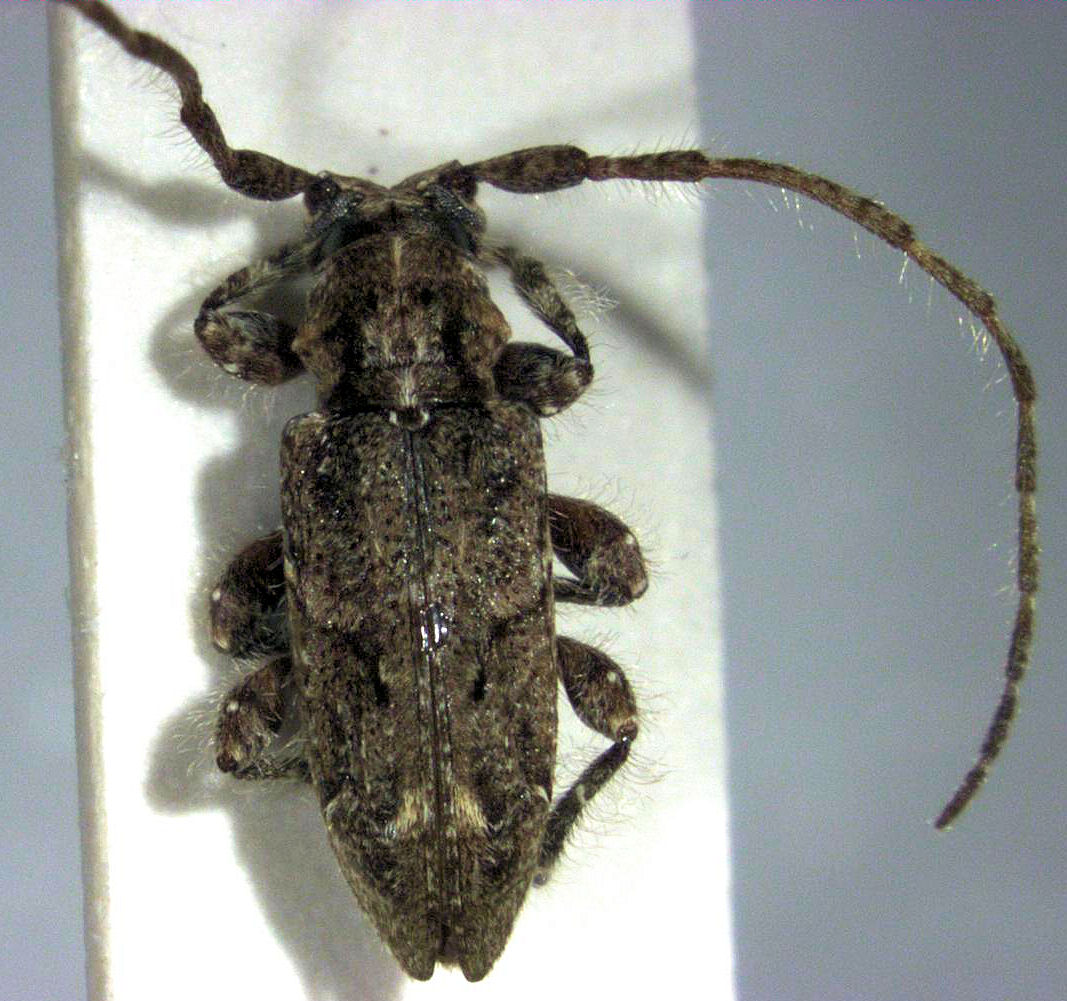
- Tetrorea variegata

Scientific classification
- Domain: Eukaryota
- Kingdom: Animalia
- Phylum: Arthropoda
- Class: Insecta
- Order: Coleoptera
- Suborder: Polyphaga
- Infraorder: Cucujiformia
- Family: Cerambycidae
- Subfamily: Lamiinae
- Genus: Tetrorea

= Tetrorea =

Genus of beetles

Tetrorea is a genus of longhorn beetles of the subfamily Lamiinae, containing the following species:

- Tetrorea cilipes White, 1846
- Tetrorea discedens Sharp, 1880
- Tetrorea longipennis Sharp, 1886
- Tetrorea sellata Sharp, 1882
