= Tetrorea sellata =

Scientific classification
- Kingdom: Animalia
- Phylum: Arthropoda
- Class: Insecta
- Order: Coleoptera
- Suborder: Polyphaga
- Infraorder: Cucujiformia
- Family: Cerambycidae
- Genus: Tetrorea
- Species: T. sellata

Binomial name
- Tetrorea sellata Sharp, 1882

Species of beetle

Tetrorea sellata is a species of beetle in the family Cerambycidae. It was described by Sharp in 1882. It is known from New Zealand. It contains the varietas Tetrorea sellata var. maculata.
