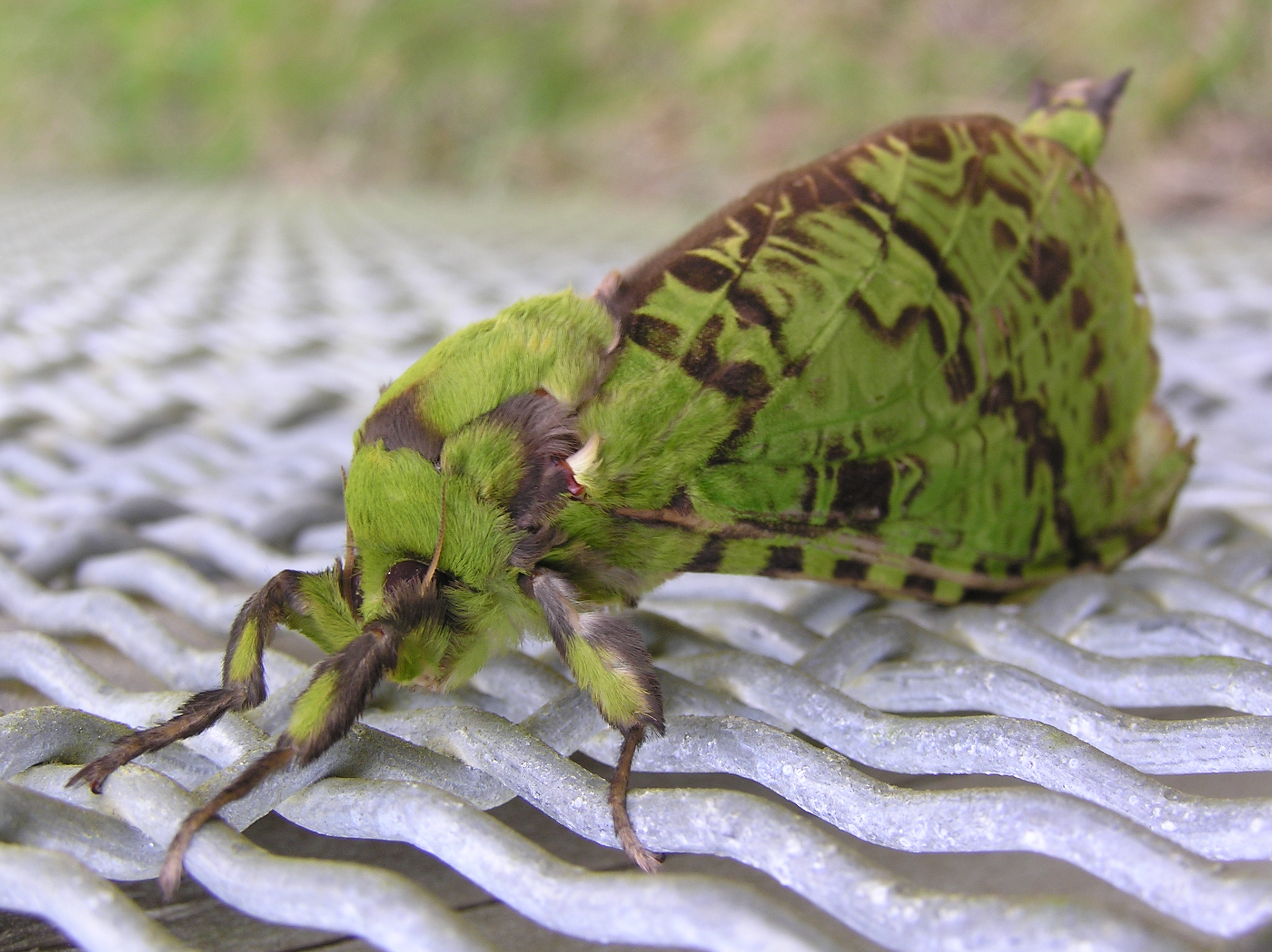

Scientific classification
- Kingdom: Animalia
- Phylum: Arthropoda
- Clade: Pancrustacea
- Class: Insecta
- Order: Lepidoptera
- Family: Hepialidae
- Genus: Aenetus
- Species: A. virescens

Binomial name
- Aenetus virescens (Doubleday, 1843)

Synonyms
- Hepialus virescens Doubleday, 1843

= Pūriri moth =

Species of moth

The pūriri moth (Aenetus virescens), also commonly called the ghost moth or pepetuna, is a species of moth of the family Hepialidae. This moth is endemic to the North Island of New Zealand. It is New Zealand's largest moth, with a wingspan of up to 150 mm. It spends the first five to six years of its life as a caterpillar in a tree trunk (common host plants are the pūriri tree (Vitex lucens) and putaputāwētā (Carpodetus serratus), but pūriri larva also inhabit non-native species such as Eucalyptus), with the last 48 hours of its life as a moth.

== Taxonomy ==
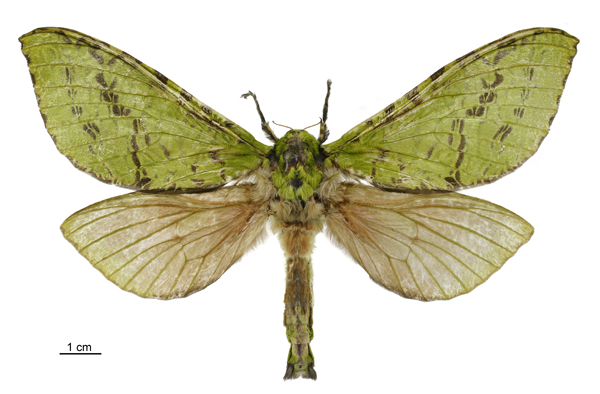
Aenetus virescens female LCR

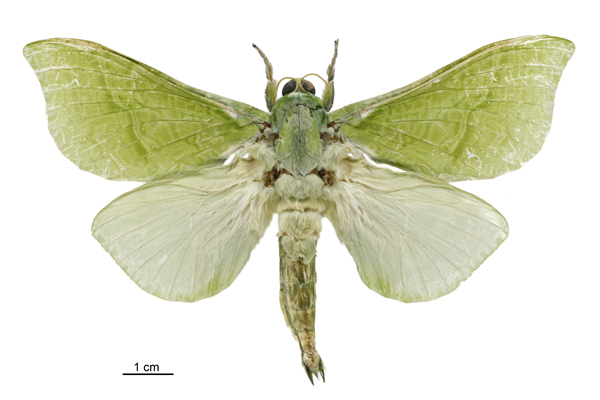
Aenetus virescens male LCR

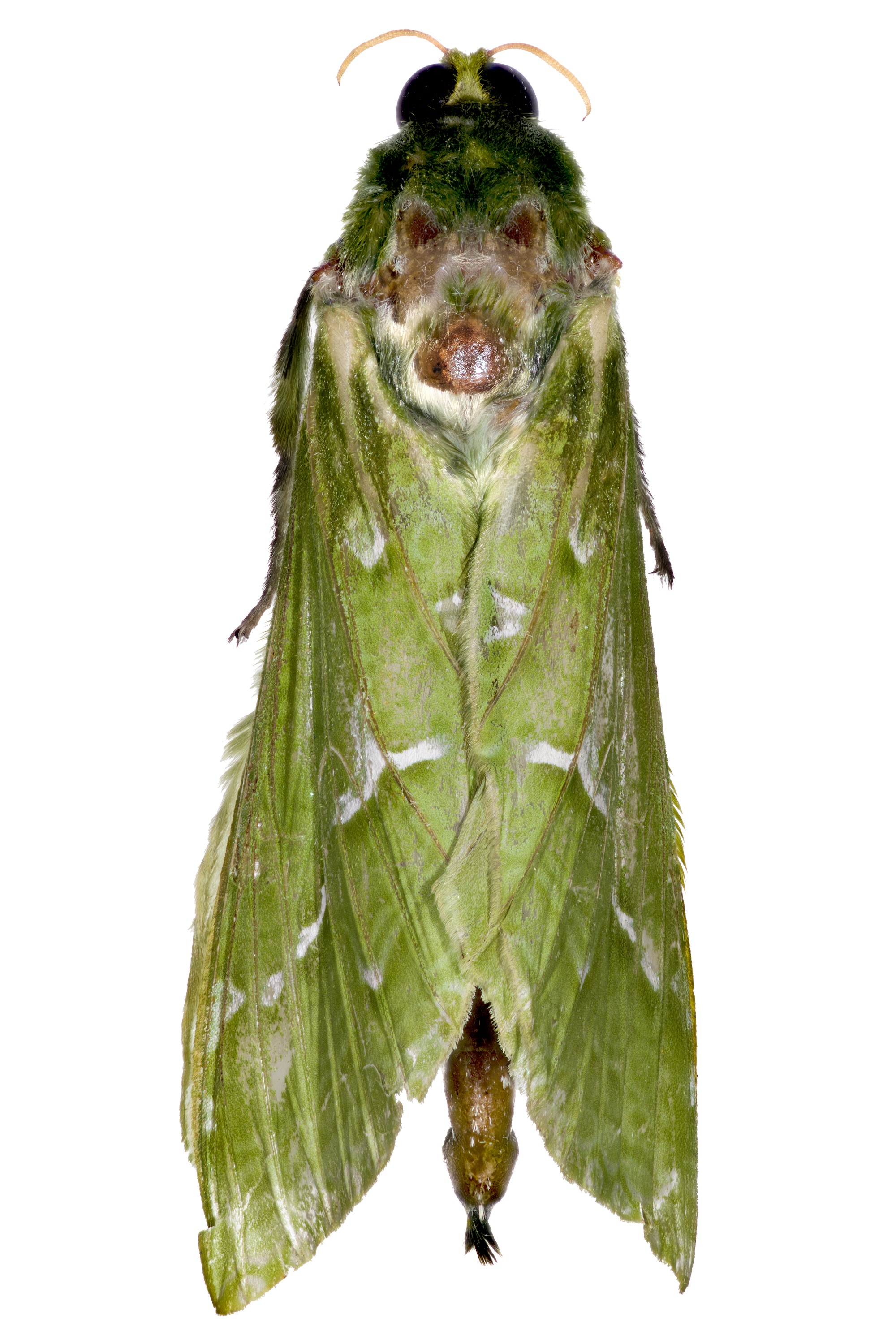
Male pūriri moth, wings at rest

This species was first described in 1843 by Edward Doubleday in the book Travels in New Zealand by Ernst Dieffenbach. Doubleday named the species Hepialis uirescens. George Hudson discussed and illustrated this species under that name in his book The Butterflies and Moths of New Zealand. The moth is also commonly called the ghost moth or pepetuna.

== Description ==
The pūriri moth is easily identifiable by its large size and vivid forewing colouration. Adults exhibit sexual dimorphism. With a wingspan that averages 100mm (for males) and 150mm (for females), it is New Zealand's largest native winged insect. The forewings generally exhibit a range of bright greens, with patterning of brownish black in females and a white pattern in males. The hind wings are a pinkish colour. There is colour variation within the species, with some individuals exhibiting blue-green, bright yellow, brick-red or even albino wing colouration.

The moths are nocturnal forest-dwellers. In the past males frequently swarmed lights in areas inhabited by people - early settlers reported great swarms of the moths "invading rooms, sufficient in number to extinguish lighted lamps". However with forest clearing, this has become less common.

Pūriri moths are predated upon by birds, including kākā and moreporks (who tend to feed on the adult moths when they congregate around lights), native bats, cats, and brushtail possums. The larva also are traditionally eaten by Māori, who flushed the caterpillars (known as ngutara) out of their tunnels with water.

== Life cycle ==
The caterpillar stage may last up to six years. The adult moths emerge mostly from September through to November. Adults live only a few days at most, generally being most active at dusk and night time when they mate and lay eggs. The adults do not have any mouthparts and cannot feed, so are sustained only by larval food reserves.

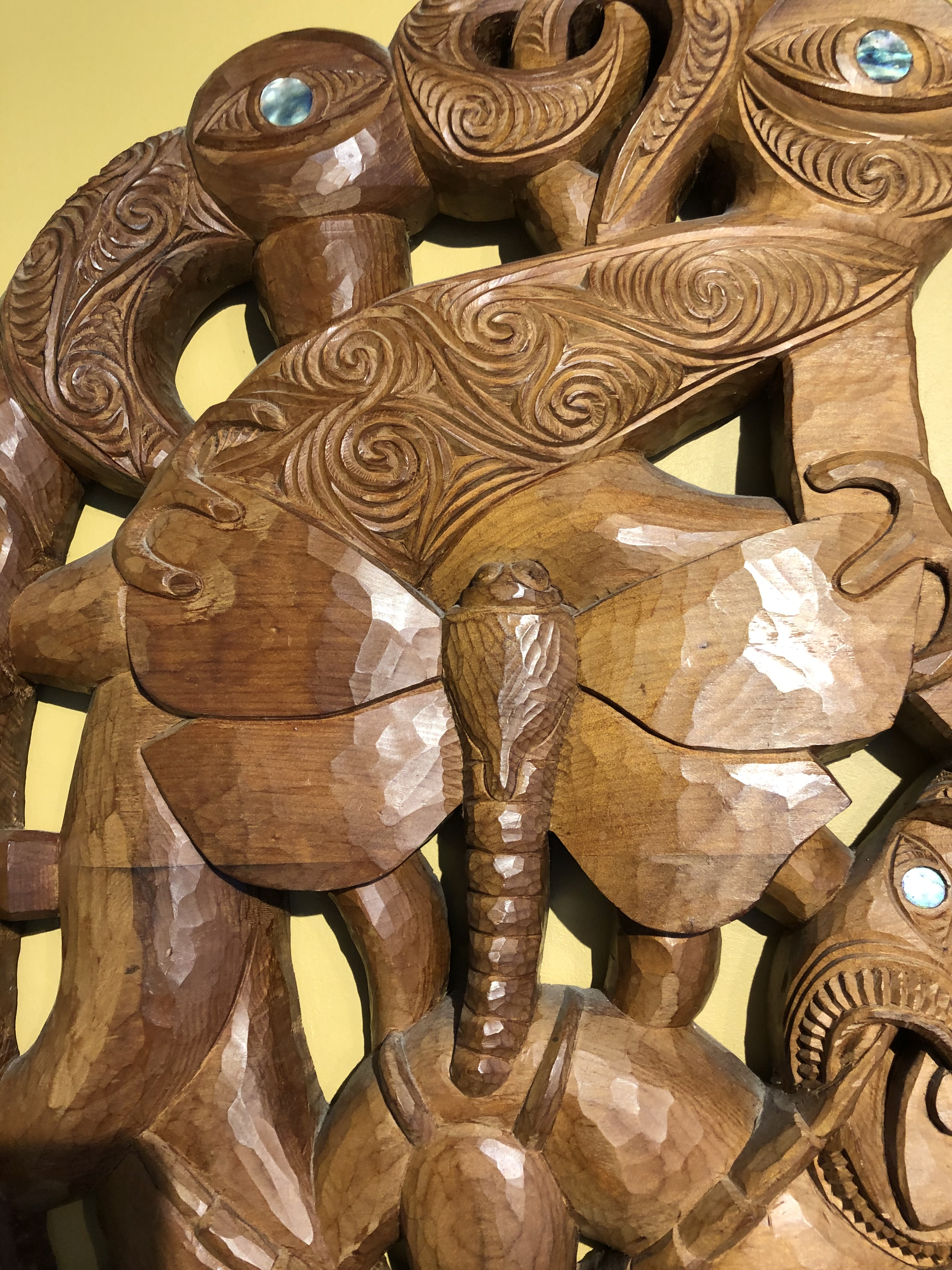
Pūriri moth carved on pare on display at the New Zealand Arthropod Collection at Landcare Research, Auckland.

The female moths oviposit around 2000 eggs during their adult lifetime. The eggs are randomly laid on the forest floor. The eggs are initially yellow-white, and darken to black, before hatching (normally after about 2 weeks). Initially the larva live under decaying wood close to the ground where they feed on bracket fungi. After about a year of living on the forest floor, the larva move into their host tree, and construct a burrow in the growing trunks and limbs of their host plants. This tunnel is often described as seven-shaped. Approximately 13mm in diameter it penetrates into the tree approximately 40-50mm and then runs perpendicularly down the tree for around 150mm at its largest. The tunnel is gradually expanded as the larva grows and moults. The tunnel is protected and camouflaged by a covering web constructed of silk and wood chips.

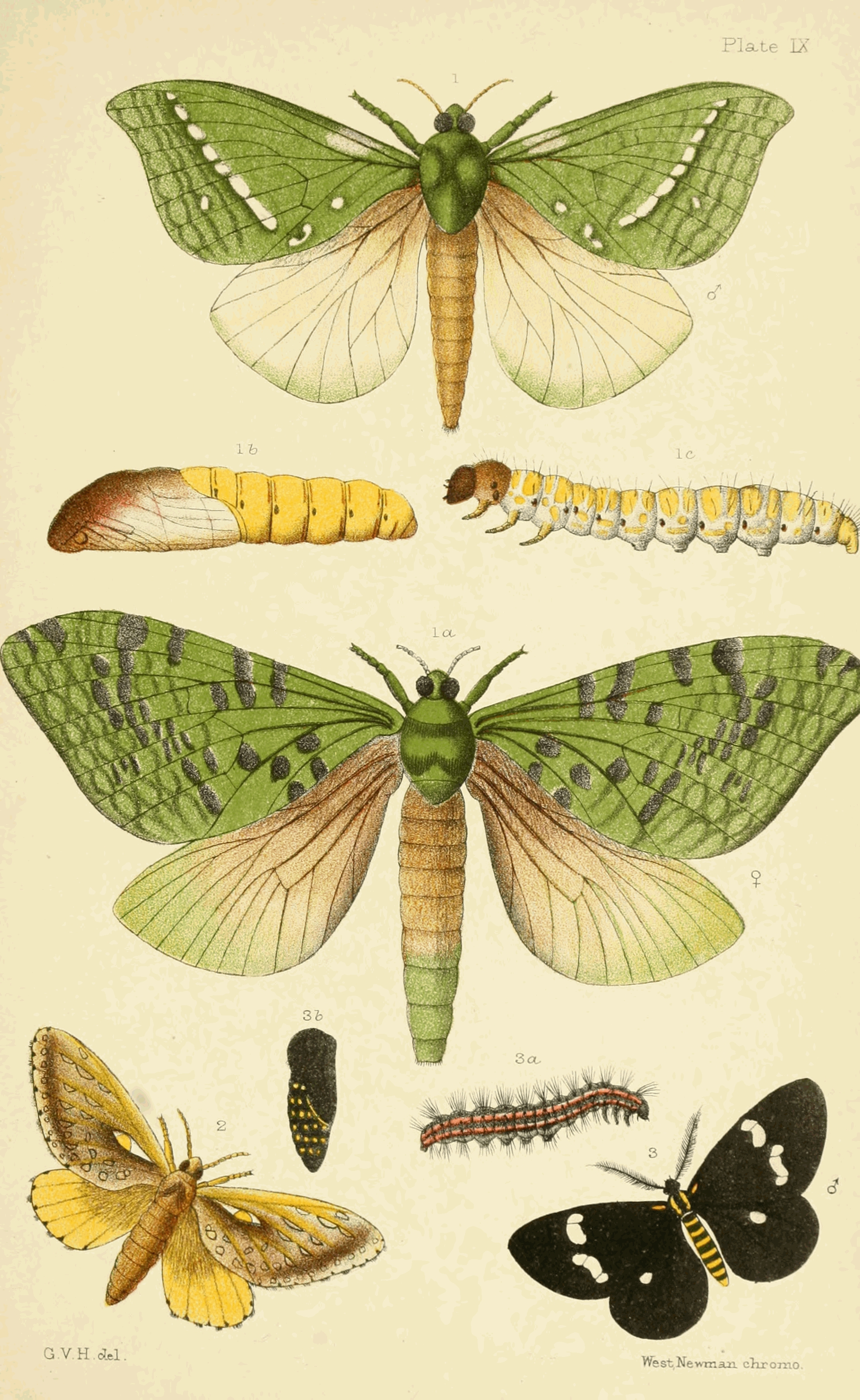
Illustration of life stages of pūriri moth (1a-1c) from "An elementary manual of New Zealand entomology; being an introduction to the study of our native insects", George Vernon Hudson (1892).

The larva emerges at night to feed on callus tissue around the entrance to the burrow, where it is hidden under a camouflaged web of silk (often matching the bark in colour and texture). The larva reaches a length of approximately 100mm before it pupates. The pupal stage lasts 4 to 5 months before the pupa wriggles up the shaft of the tunnel and, protruding through the covering web, emerges by splitting through the skin of the pupa. Footage has been taken of a pūriri moth chrysalis hatching over a period of one hour and forty minutes. The moth spends the last 48 hours of its life as a moth.

=== Host plants ===
The moth is named after the pūriri tree (Vitex lucens), a common host plant. However it also lives in a range of native and non-native forest trees. The putaputawētā (Carpodetus serratus) is another common host plant, which is named after the wētā that often shelter in the old holes vacated by pūriri moth larva. The larva also inhabit native beech, tītoki, kānuka and maire and smaller trees such as mānuka, wineberry and houhere. Introduced plants such as eucalyptus, English oak, silver birch, lemon, apple and willow are also used as hosts.

Host plants include:

- Smoky bracket
- Alectryon excelsus, tītoki
- Aristotelia serrata, wineberry or makomako
- Buddleja davidii, Buddleia
- Carpodetus serratus, marbleleaf or putaputawētā
