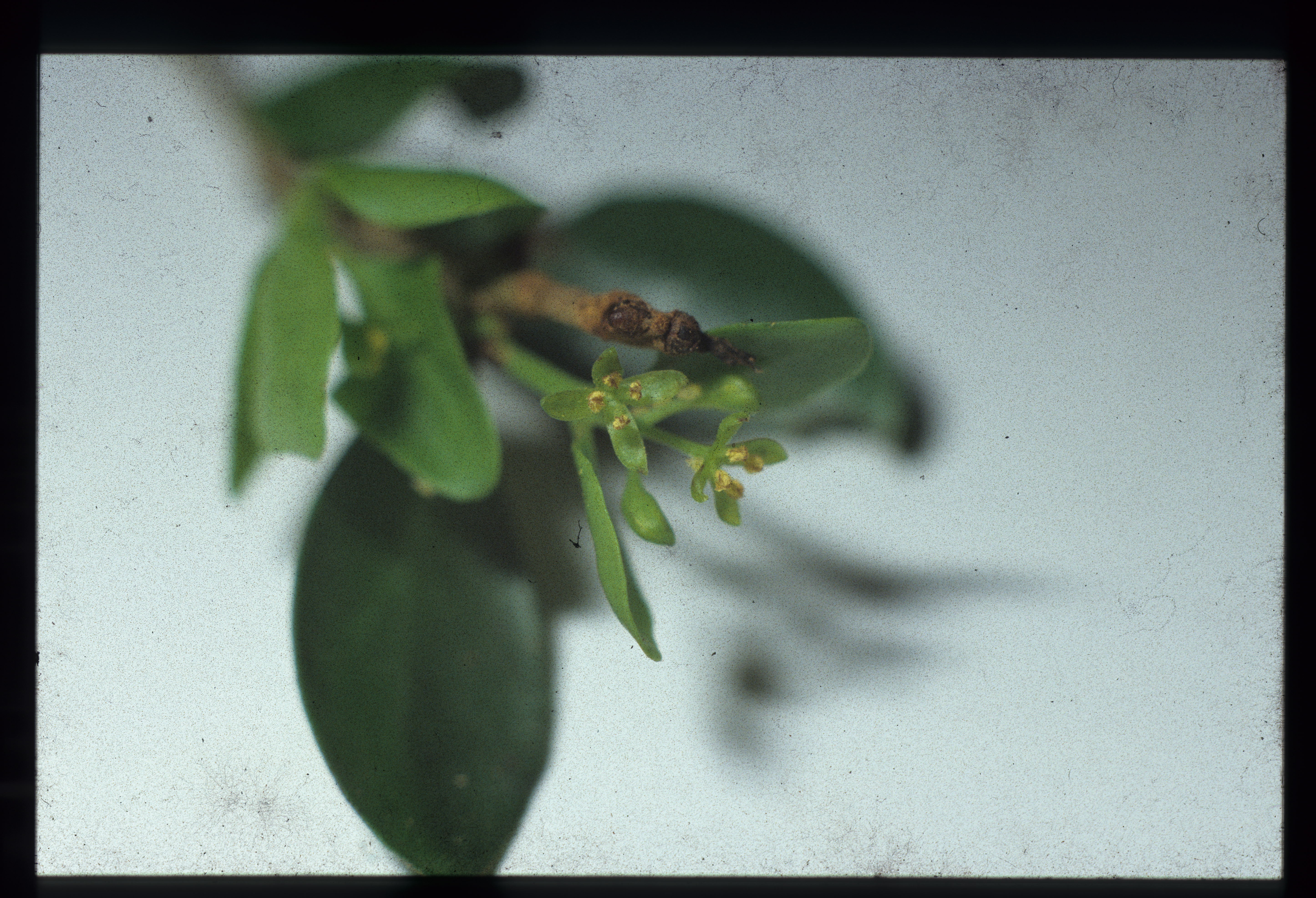
- Tupeia antarctica
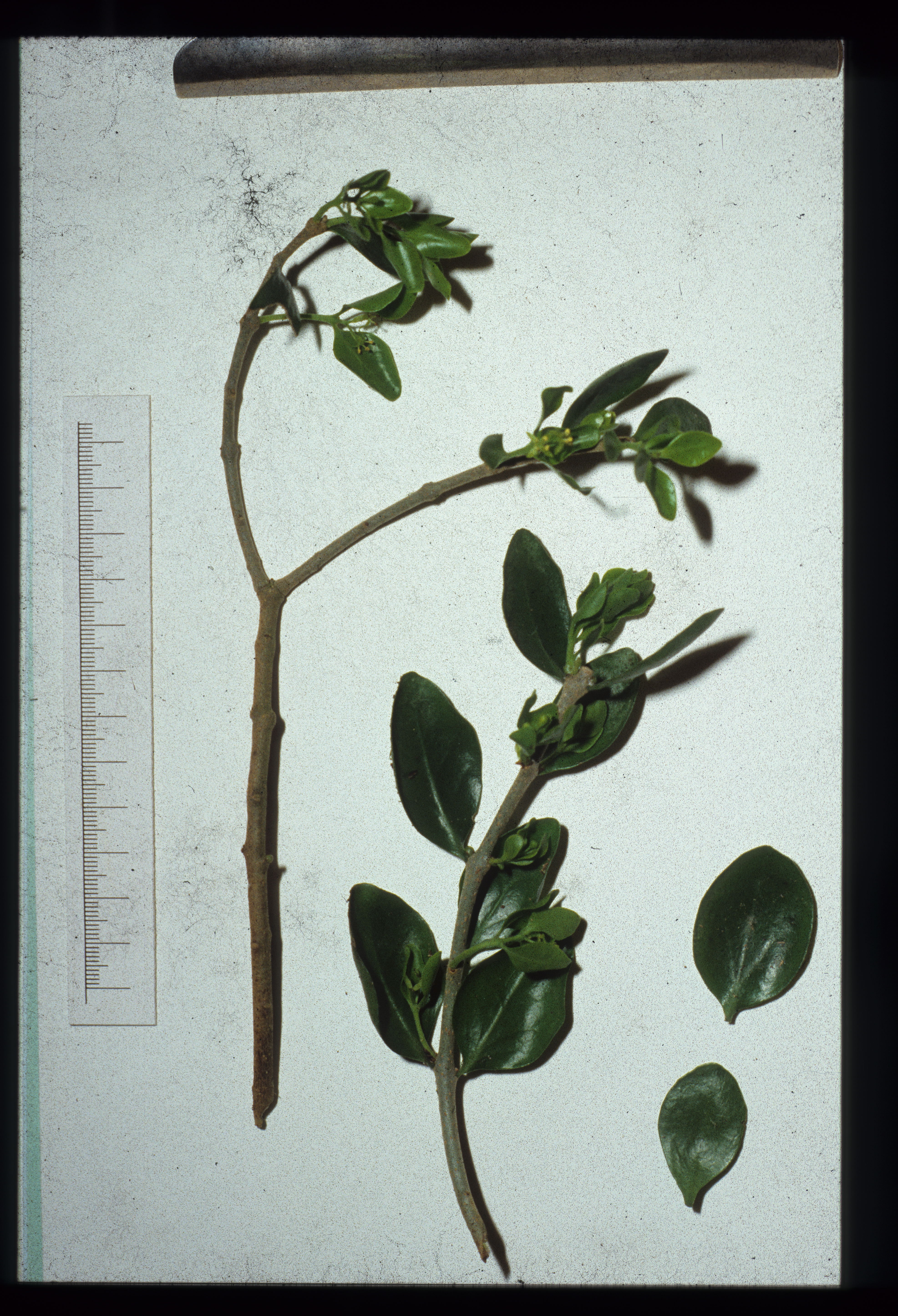
- Tupeia antarctica

Conservation status
- Declining (NZ TCS)

Scientific classification
- Kingdom: Plantae
- Clade: Tracheophytes
- Clade: Angiosperms
- Clade: Eudicots
- Order: Santalales
- Family: Loranthaceae
- Genus: Tupeia; Cham. & Schltdl.
- Species: T. antarctica

Binomial name
- Tupeia antarctica (G.Forst.) Cham. & Schltdl.

= Tupeia =

Genus of mistletoes

Tupeia is a monotypic genus of semi-parasitic shrubs (mistletoes) which occurs in both the North and South Islands of New Zealand. There is only one species in the genus: Tupeia antarctica. There are no synonyms.

== Species ==
- Tupeia antarctica (G.Forst.) Cham. & Schltdl.

== Description ==
The species, Tupeia antarctica (common names - tāpia, kohuorangi, pirinoa, piritia, white mistletoe), is a Diecious mistletoe which grows up to 1m wide. Its bark is white, and the twigs are finely hairy. The leaves are variously shaped, fleshy, bright green and from 10 to 70 mm long. The flowers are tiny and the fruit is white to pinkish.

=== Habitat ===
It is found in forest or scrub, on a wide range of hosts including tarata (Pittosporum eugenioides), karo (Pittosporum crassifolium), Coprosma species, putaputaweta (Carpodetus serratus), fivefinger (Pseudopanax arboreus), white maire (Nestegis lanceolata) and broom. According to De Lange et al., Tupeia antarctica parasitises some 48 hosts (11 exotic) with the most common host families being Fabaceae and Rubiaceae.

== Etymology ==
The genus is named for Tupaia (c. 1725 – 1770), a Tahitian navigator and priest. The specific epithet, antarctica, derives from the Latin word, anti, meaning "against" or "opposite" and the Greek word, arktos, meaning "bear", giving an adjective, antarctica, which meant opposite the constellations of the Ursus Major and Ursus Minor, "opposing the north", or "Antarctic".

== Taxonomy ==
Tupeia antarctica was originally described by G.Forst. in 1786 as Viscum antarcticum, but the genus was revised to Tupeia in 1828 by Chamisso and Schlechtendal.

== Status ==
Tupeia antarctica is classified (2018) as having an "At Risk - Declining" conservation status under the New Zealand Threat Classification System, (its predicted decline from greater than 100 000 individuals being from 10 to 70%). A 2002 study discusses the threat from possum browsing which is preventing the recruitment of new individuals.
