= Tetrorea longipennis =

Scientific classification
- Kingdom: Animalia
- Phylum: Arthropoda
- Class: Insecta
- Order: Coleoptera
- Suborder: Polyphaga
- Infraorder: Cucujiformia
- Family: Cerambycidae
- Genus: Tetrorea
- Species: T. longipennis

Binomial name
- Tetrorea longipennis Sharp, 1886

Species of beetle

Tetrorea longipennis is a species of beetle in the family Cerambycidae. It was described by Sharp in 1886. It is known from New Zealand.
