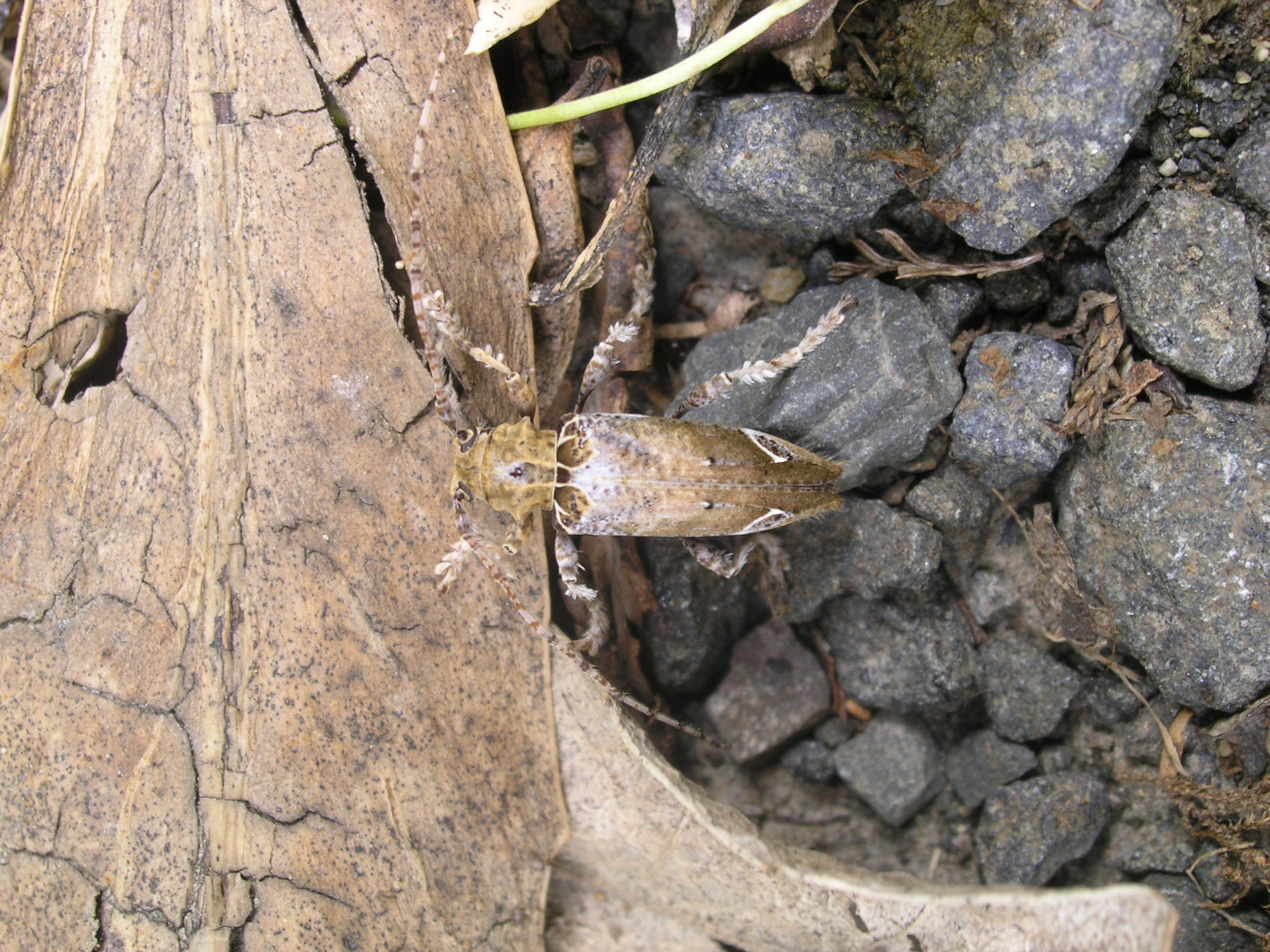

Scientific classification
- Kingdom: Animalia
- Phylum: Arthropoda
- Class: Insecta
- Order: Coleoptera
- Suborder: Polyphaga
- Infraorder: Cucujiformia
- Family: Cerambycidae
- Genus: Tetrorea
- Species: T. cilipes

Binomial name
- Tetrorea cilipes White, 1846

= Tetrorea cilipes =

Species of beetle

Tetrorea cilipes is a species of beetle in the family Cerambycidae. It was described by Adam White in 1846. It is known from New Zealand.

== Life cycle ==
Eggs are laid singly or in twos and threes in small patches of chewed bark on twigs. The incubation period can vary from 16 to 25 days and some adults emerge in one year whereas others emerge in two years. The pupal and adult development periods range from 24 to 36 days. The adults emerge from November to late January. The larvae of T. cilipes are known to make a distinct clicking sound.
