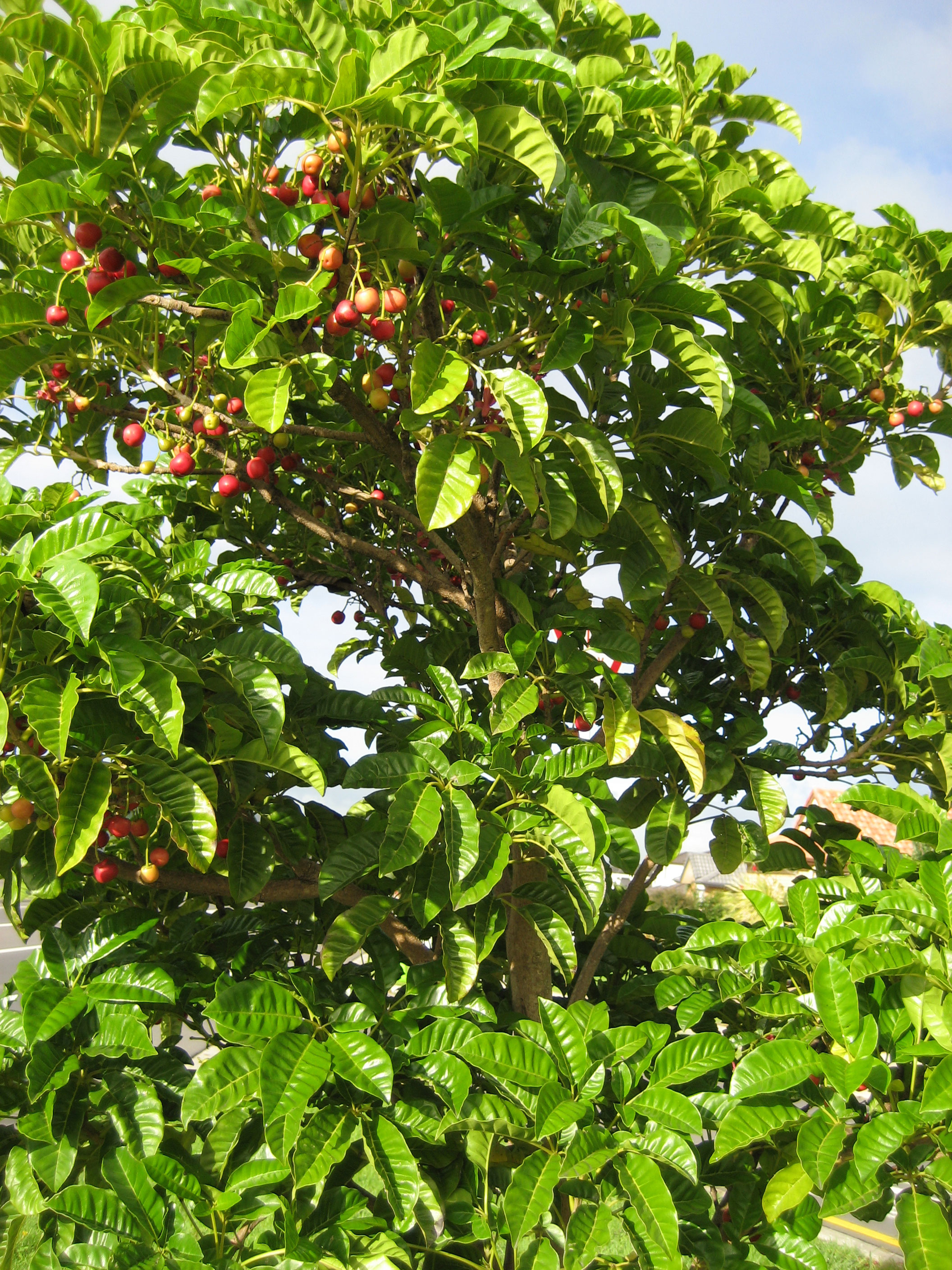
- A young tree with fruit in Auckland

Conservation status
- Not Threatened (NZ TCS)

Scientific classification
- Kingdom: Plantae
- Clade: Tracheophytes
- Clade: Angiosperms
- Clade: Eudicots
- Clade: Asterids
- Order: Lamiales
- Family: Lamiaceae
- Genus: Vitex
- Species: V. lucens

Binomial name
- Vitex lucens Kirk

= Vitex lucens =

Species of tree

Vitex lucens, commonly known as pūriri, is an evergreen tree endemic to New Zealand.

== Description ==
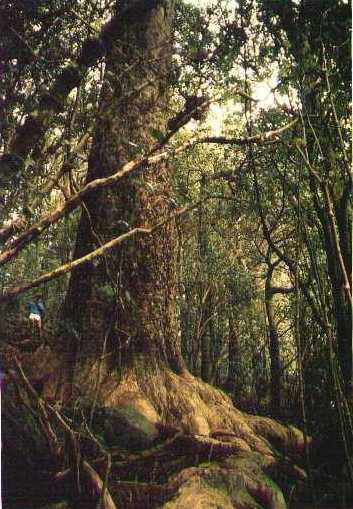
A large pūriri near Ruapekapeka, Northland

The pūriri tree can grow up to 20 metres (66 feet) tall, with a trunk commonly up to 1.5 m (4 ft 11 in) in diameter, frequently thicker, and a broad spreading crown. The thin bark is usually smooth and light brown in colour, but can also be very flaky. Pūriri was actively and selectively logged in the past to provide timber for a wide range of end uses. Only the best trees were felled, leaving the gnarled pūriri often found on farm paddocks. This has given the impression that pūriri is incapable of growing straight, but early reports of pūriri describe naturally clear boles of 15 to 30 feet (4.5 to 9 m) and there are still a few trees like that left. A good example of a well-shaped tree is behind Ruapekapeka Pā in Northland.

=== Leaves ===
The dark green glossy leaves of pūriri are palmate with usually 5 leaflets, or sometimes three. The lowest two leaflets are smaller than the other three. The leaflets have domatia, little pockets where the mid vein and branching veins meet, which can house arthropods. The underside and veins are a lighter green. Seedling leaves are much more delicate and a lighter green with serrations along the edge. Seedling pūriri can be confused with seedlings of the kohekohe; the most obvious difference is that pūriri leaflets originate from one point, whereas kohekohe leaflets are spread along the stalk. The branches of pūriri, especially the young ones, are square in cross-section.

=== Flowers ===
Pūriri is one of the few native trees with large colourful flowers. The tubular flowers of the pūriri look rather like snapdragon flowers and can range from fluorescent pink to dark red, rose pink (most common) or sometimes even to a white flower with a yellow or pink blush. The bright colour, the tube shape, copious nectar production and the hairs at the base of the flower tube all support birds pollinating this flower (the hairs stop insects from stealing the nectar). On the New Zealand mainland there is often plenty of nectar in the flowers because there aren't enough birds to eat all the nectar produced by the tree.

The flower has 4 lobes (made of 2 petals), 4 long stamen (the male part of the flower) and the style grows to be as long as the stamen after the pollen has shed. It is interesting to see how the flowers open. The petals overlap each other in the bud form. The growing stamen push the petals open. When the flower is fully open the style starts growing and reaches its full length just after the anthers on the stamen have shed all the pollen. The flowers occur in loose clusters of up to 12 flowers per cluster.

Some flowers can be found on the pūriri all year round, although it flowers most heavily over winter. Ripe fruit can be found all year round, but is more common over the summer. Pūriri is a very important tree for native birds in the top half of the North Island because it provides a constant year-round food supply. Flowers and fruit are carried at the tips of the branches.

=== Fruit ===
The fruit or drupe is a bright red (usually) to a pale yellow (rarely, and only on white flowered trees) "cherry". It can grow as big as a cherry, but it is unpleasantly astringent. When broken, the fruit has a bright thin juice, and a faint grape smell. Pūriri fruit are not especially nutritious (high in carbohydrates, not lipids, sugars or calcium), but they are common. The nut (endocarp) inside the drupe is a very hard pear-shaped kernel that can contain up to 4 seeds. The seedlings from one kernel can germinate at the same time or be spread over a year. The nut has four apertures in the endocarp each guarded by an oval door and each leading to a seed chamber. The pūriri is self-fertile with self-fertilization (autogamy) possible. Seed production in 12 samples ranged from 8% to 45% with usually only 1 or 2 live seeds in a fruit. This low seed production is due to inefficiencies in pollination, as well as breakdown of apparently fully developed seeds. Factors controlling germination and opening of the doors are unknown, and most seed would appear to die within the imprisoning nut.

=== Gallery ===
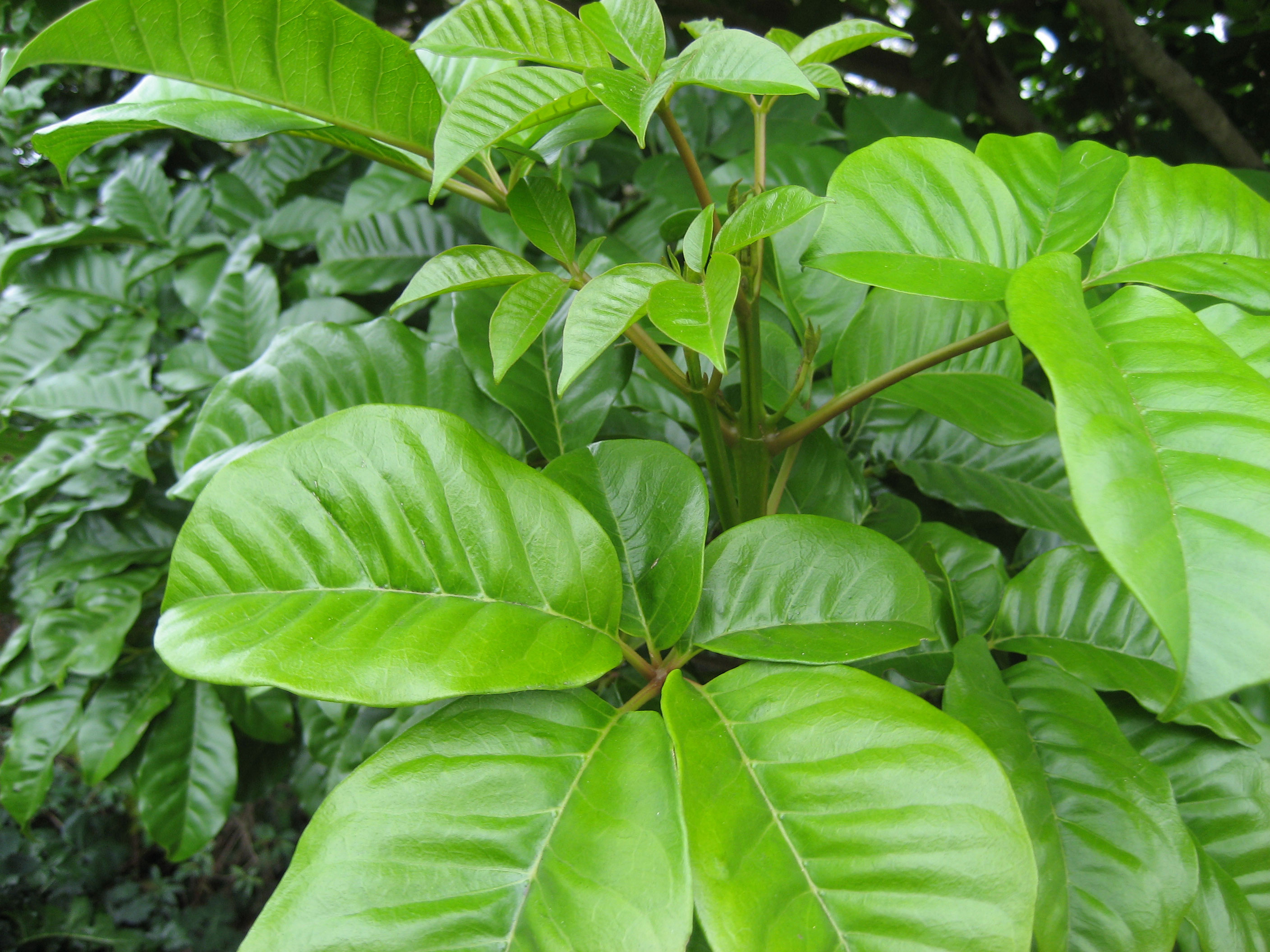
The lush palmate leaves of a young pūriri

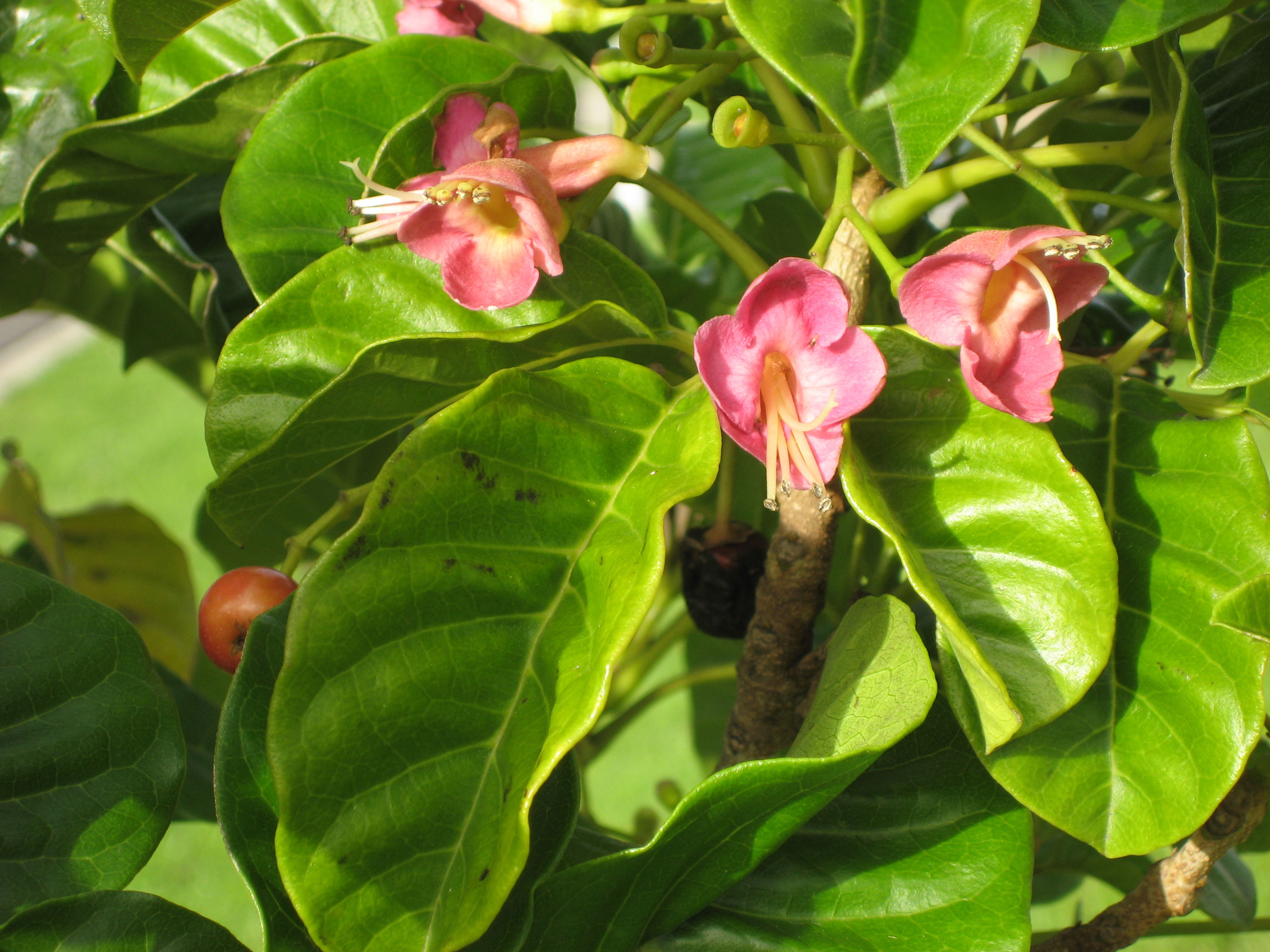
Pūriri may bear flowers throughout the year

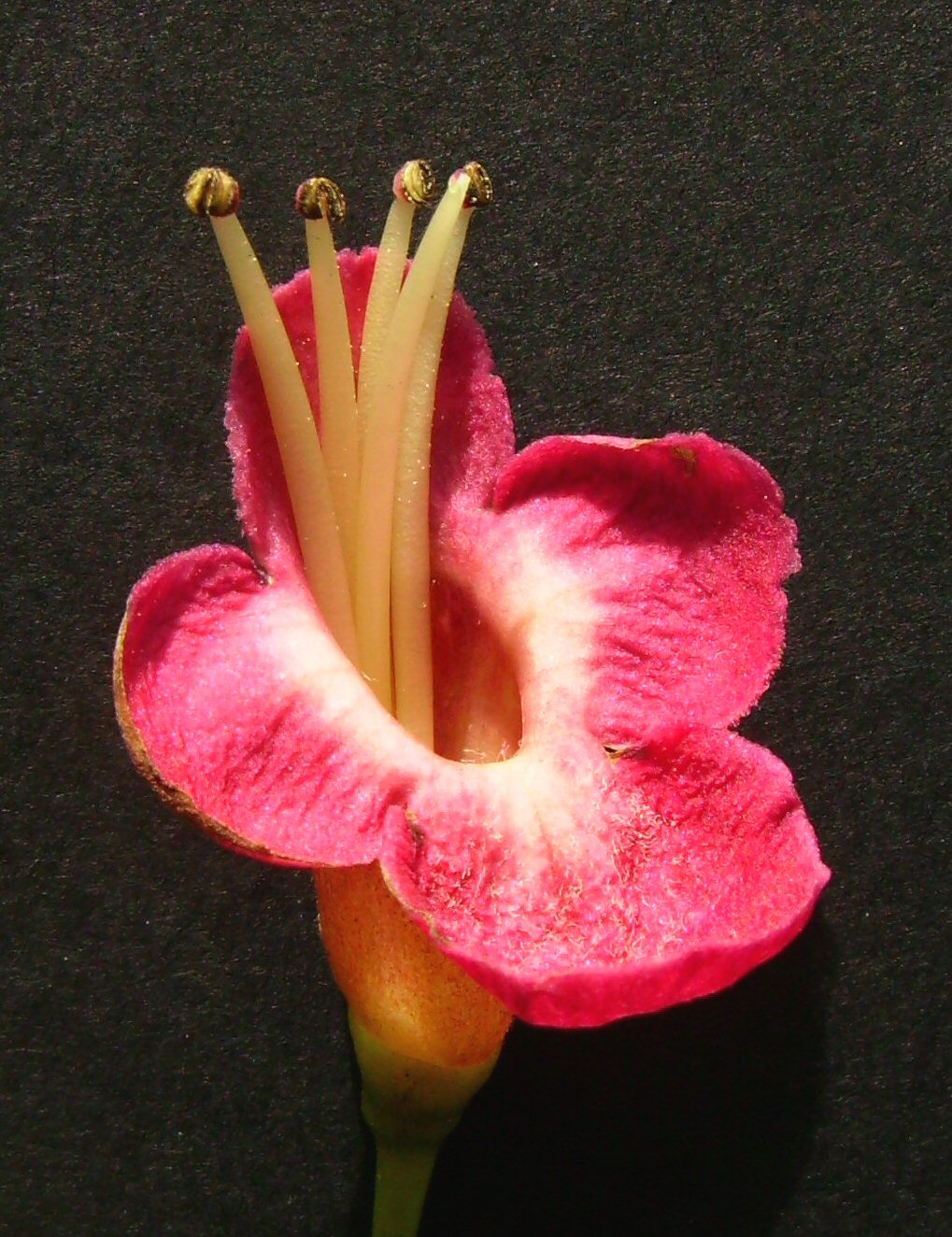
Pūriri flower

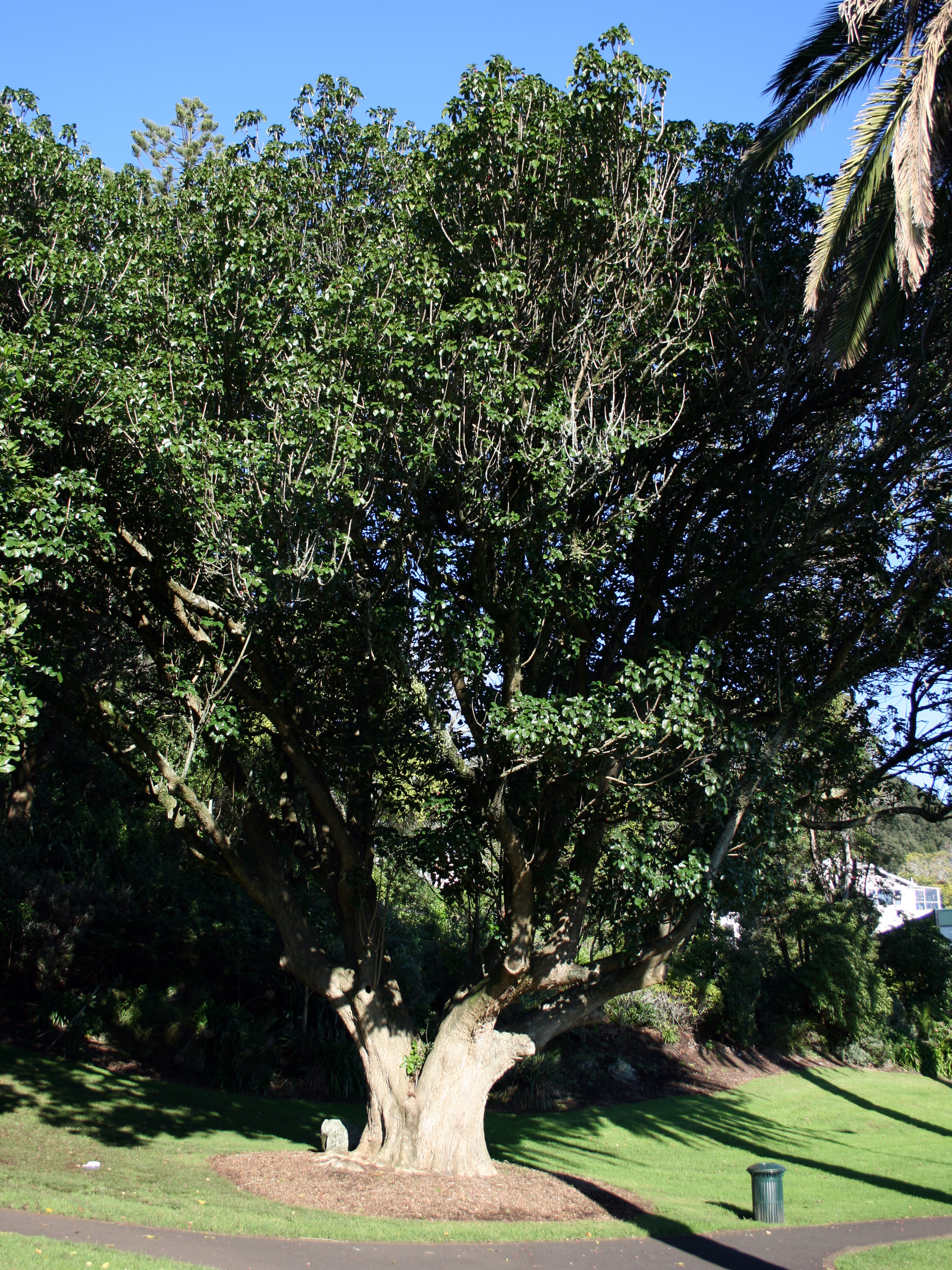
Mature tree in Auckland

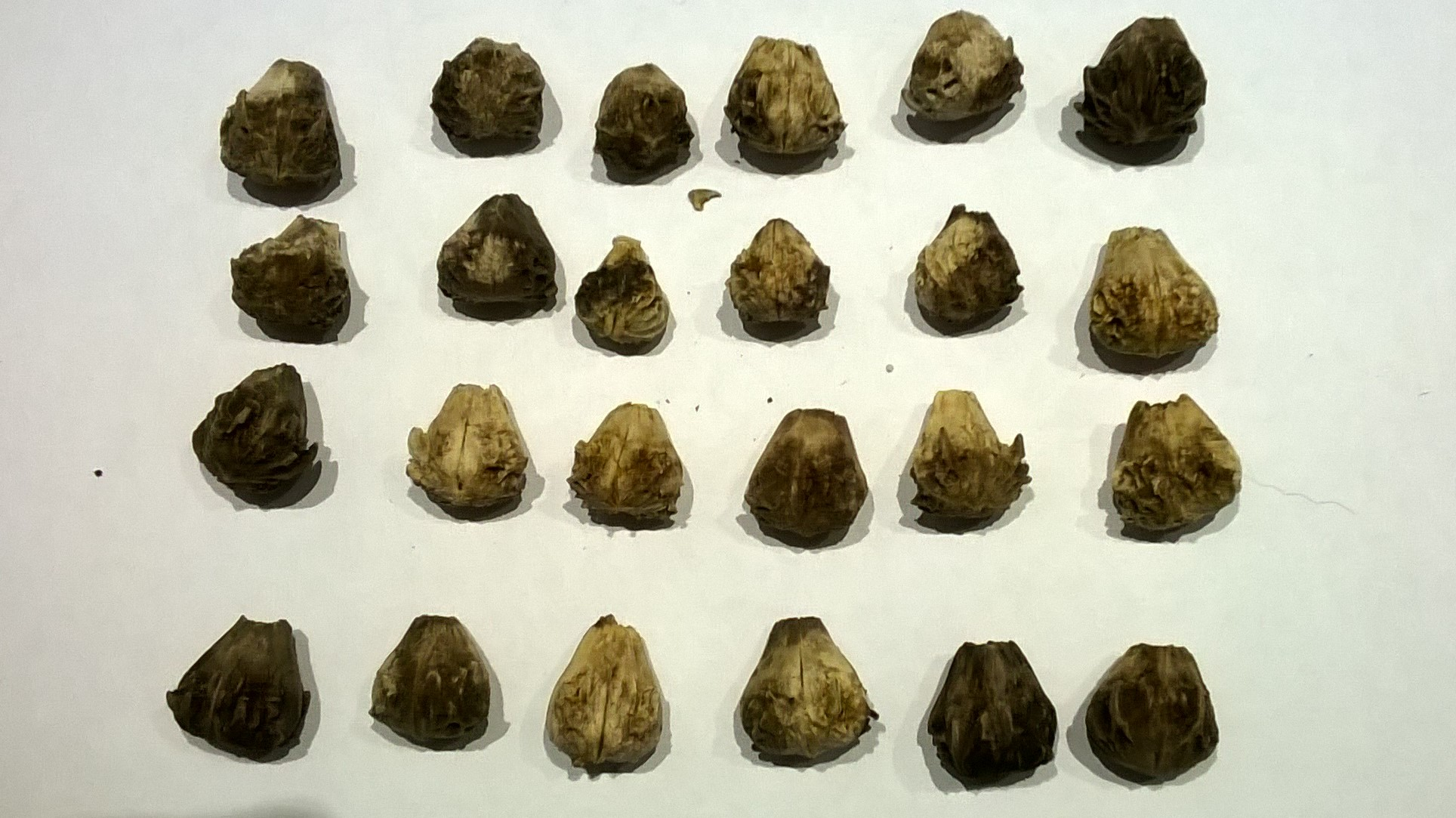
Pūriri nuts from a single tree vary in size and shape

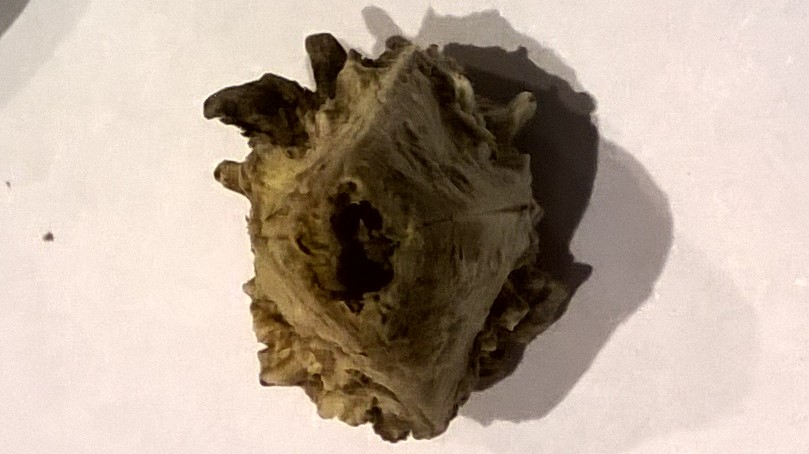
Viewed from the top of the nut (endocarp) a hole is seen formed from the four seed chambers.

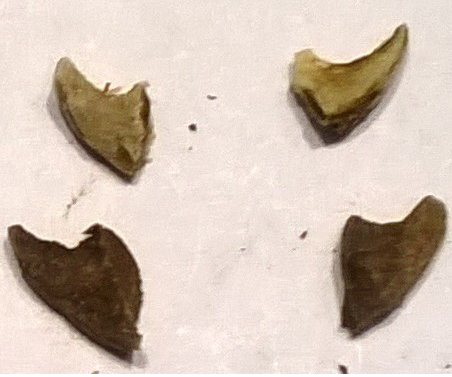
The hooks on the sides of the nuts vary in number size and shape and can be difficult to break off.

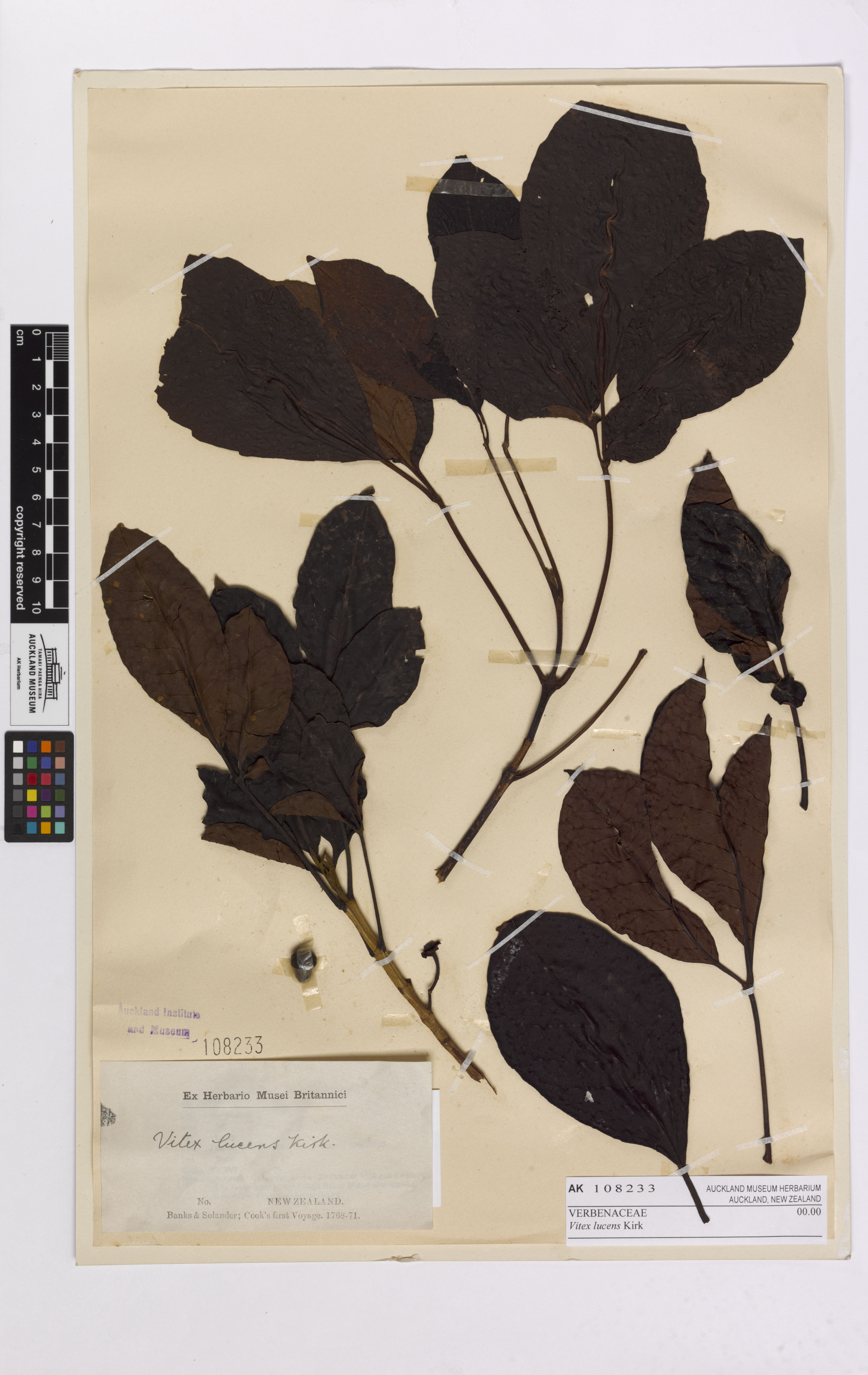
Herbarium specimen

== Taxonomy ==
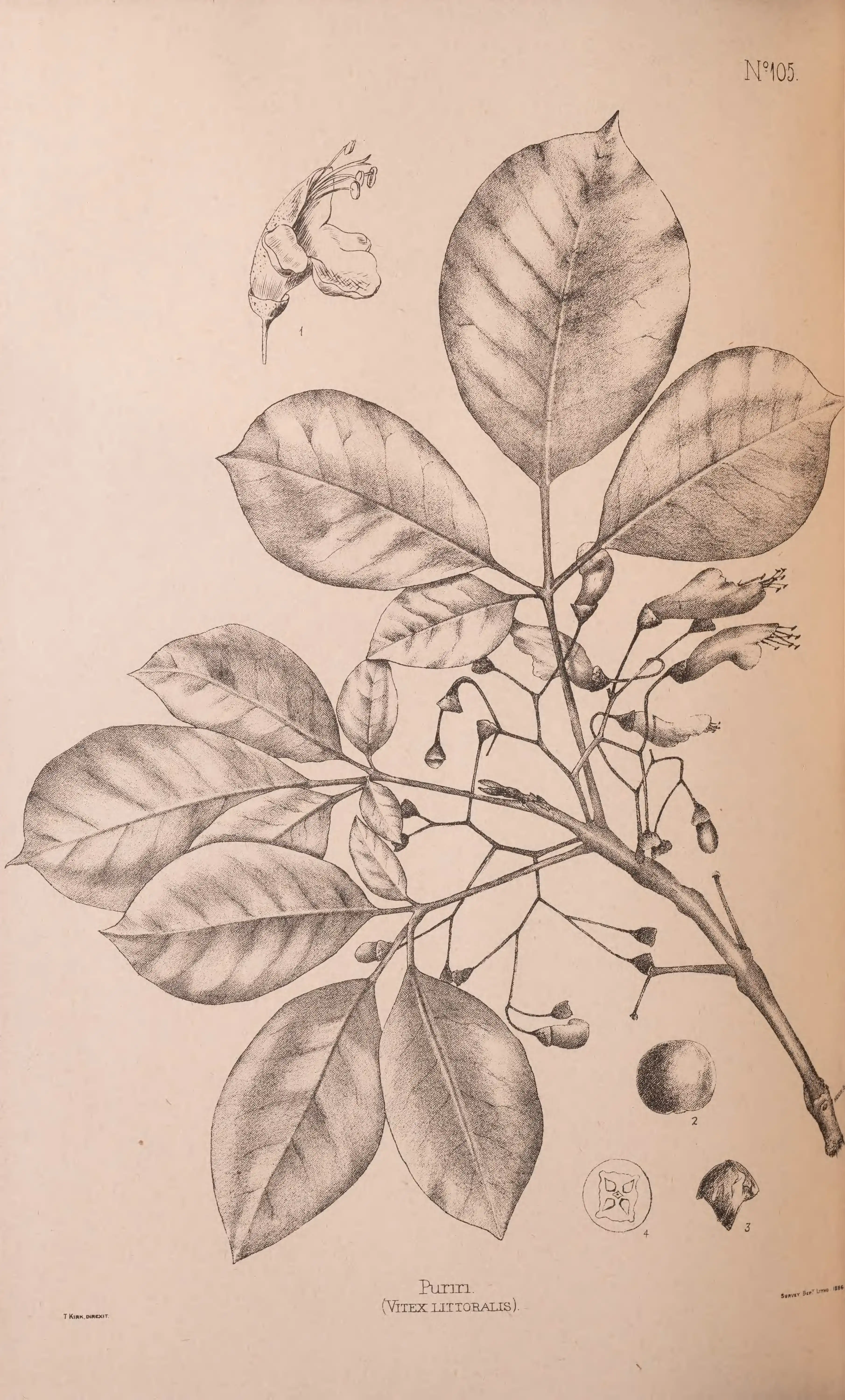
Illustrated in Kirk's The Forest Flora of New Zealand.

Pūriri was first collected by Europeans at Tolaga Bay by Banks and Solander during Cook's first visit in 1769. The plant was described by Solander in his manuscript "Primitae Florae Novae Zelandiae" under the name "Ephielis pentaphylla." A drawing was also produced as part of this manuscript. The next botanist to notice pūriri, Allan Cunningham, did not do so until 1826 when he observed it on "the rocky shores of Bay of Islands, growing frequently within the range of salt water." Cunningham named it Vitex littoralis, correctly assigning it to the genus Vitex but overlooking that "littoralis" had been used for a Malayan species four years earlier. Thomas Kirk proposed V. lucens in 1897 after attention had been drawn to the fact that V. littoralis was taken.

== Etymology ==
The Māori name of this tree is pūriri or sometimes kauere. The name is exclusive to Māori language, as no other Polynesian languages use the word to describe similar plants. Early European settlers' names for the plant include ironwood, referring to the strength of the timber, as well as New Zealand oak, New Zealand teak and New Zealand mahogany. The species epithet lucens refers means "shining", and refers to the shine of the tree's green leaves in the light.

== Distribution ==
Pūriri is endemic to New Zealand and can be found in the upper half of the North Island, from North Cape to the Waikato and Upper Thames, and from thence in small numbers southwards to Māhia Peninsula (39°10′S) on the east coast and Cape Egmont (39°27′S) on the west (rare inland south of latitude 37). Its altitudinal range is from sea-level to 800 m (2,600 ft) above sea-level. Pūriri tends to be associated with fertile or volcanic soils, and early settlers often sought out and burned pūriri rich areas to obtain good farmland. It is the only member of the genus Vitex found in New Zealand.

== As a resource and host plant ==
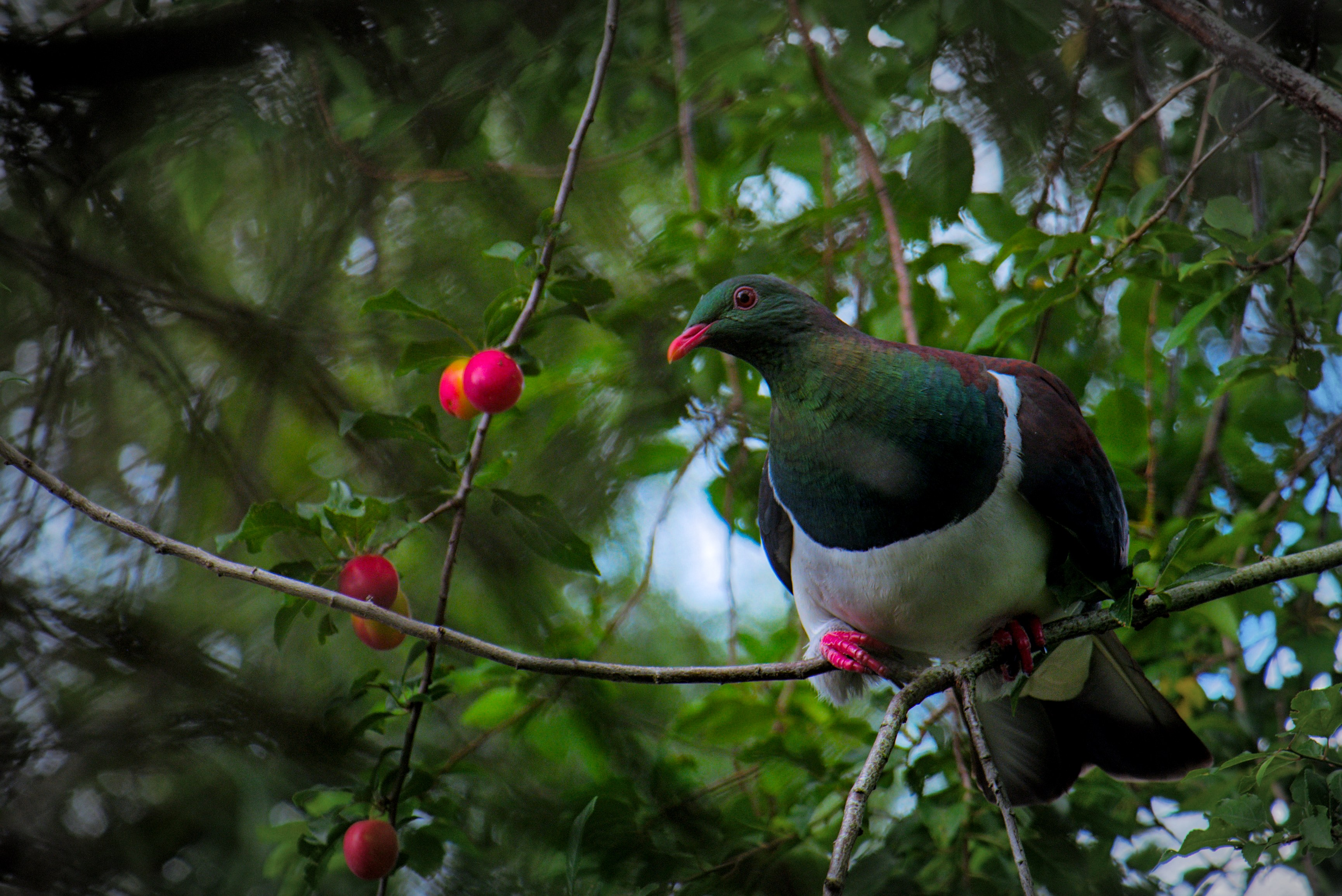
A kererū eating pūriri berries

Pūriri is an invaluable food source for native wildlife, as it provides both fruit and nectar in seasons when few other species produce. It is often used in restoration planting, such as at the Elvie McGregor Reserve (between Waipoua Forest and Katui Scenic Reserve in Northland) and on Tiritiri Matangi Island. It is hoped that restoration planting, with trees such as pūriri, will provide a year-round food source for birds, boosting their populations. Pūriri is highly valued as an aid in increasing kererū (native pigeon) populations. Maintaining kererū populations is particularly important for the natural restoration and maintenance of forest remnants, as this bird is the primary disperser of large-fruited species.

Pūriri is an essential host for several species. Larvae of the pūriri moth often make their home in pūriri trees by excavating long, seven-shaped burrows. The tree's wide-spreading branches also provide room for epiphytic species such as Astelia, puka, and northern rātā.

== Historical use ==
=== By Māori ===
Pūriri trees are often associated with mourning and burial in Māori culture, and also as a symbol of joy. Pūriri trees or groves were often tapu through their use as burial sites and pūriri leaves were fashioned into coronets or carried in hand during a tangi (funeral). Sites such as the tree named Taketakerau in Ōpōtiki were used as sites where bodies of important people were traditionally adorned on trees and left to decompose.

Pūriri in traditional Māori medicine has been used as a rheumatic remedy for centuries. Māori used infusions from boiled leaves to bathe sprains and backache, as a remedy for ulcers, especially under the ear, and for sore throats. The infusion was also used to wash the body of the deceased to help preserve it.

Pūriri timber is usually greenish dark-brown, but sometimes nearly black or streaked with yellow. It was often used for implements and structures requiring strength and durability. Māori preferred other timbers to pūriri as its cross-grain made for difficult carving, but pūriri garden tools and weapons had a long life and legend has it that buckshot used to ricochet off pūriri palisades. It was used in the construction of hīnaki (eel traps) because it is one of the few timbers that sink. Pūriri was sometimes used to dye harakeke fibres yellow. Even pūriri sawdust can produce intense yellow stains on concrete floors.

The fruit of pūriri trees is not a traditional Māori food, as they have a bitter taste.

=== By Europeans ===
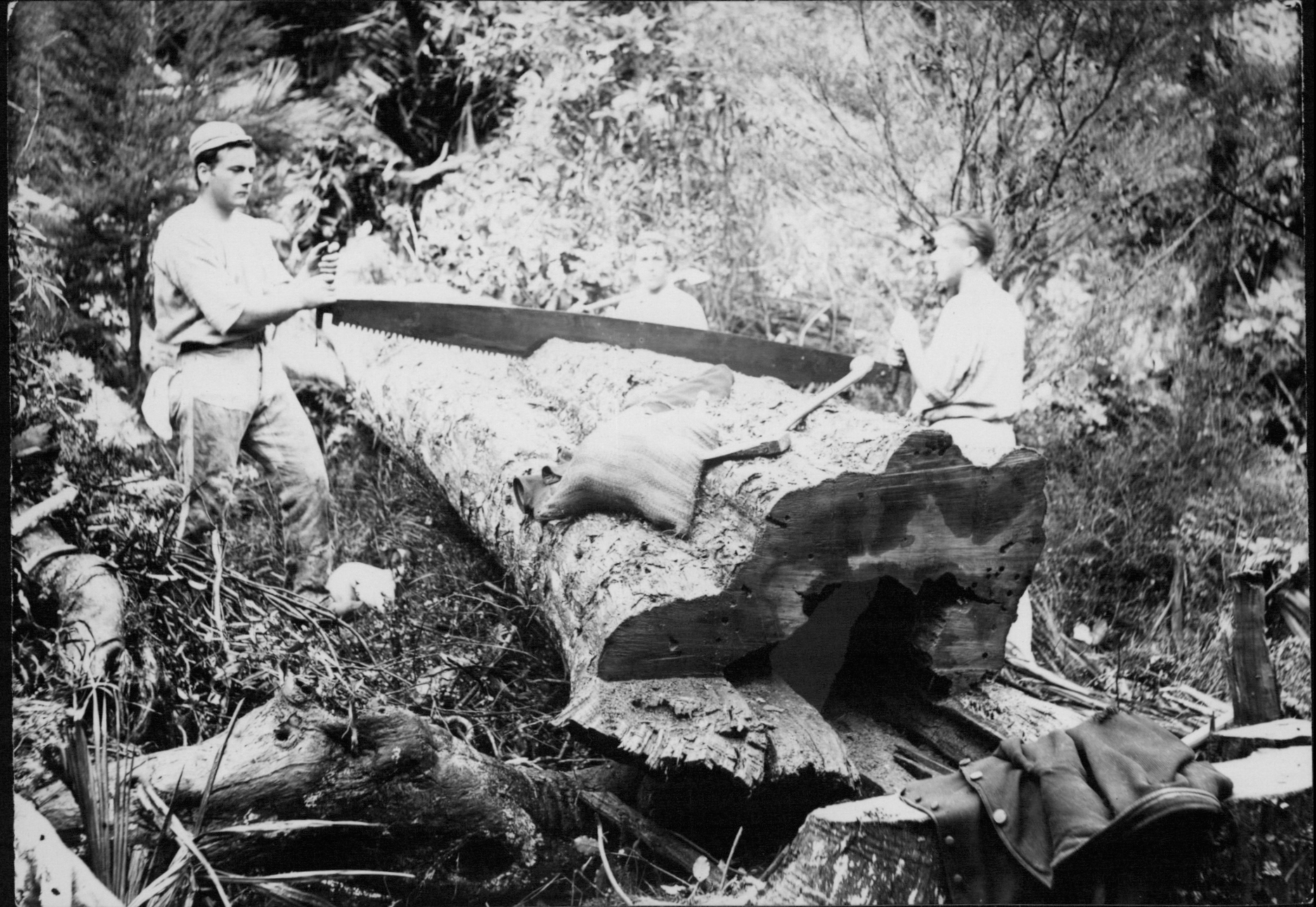
Pūriri logging on Great Barrier Island in 1902

European settlers used great quantities of pūriri timber for fence posts, railway sleepers, shipbuilding and house blocks, as it is ground durable without treatment for 50 years or more. This, as well as the agricultural desirability of the soil in which it grew, led to the depletion of once widely spread lowland pūriri forests, and by the mid-1940s the supply of pūriri timber was almost exhausted. Pūriri was also favoured for furniture and decorative wood work such as inlay veneers as its appearance was "quite equal to the best Italian or American walnut". The New Zealand Geographic article on Seuffert & Son has good examples of pūriri use in furniture. The produced timber was sometimes called "New Zealand teak", "New Zealand oak" or "New Zealand walnut".

The despatch boxes of the British House of Commons are made of pūriri wood. They were a gift from New Zealand to replace the previous boxes after the Chamber was bombed in 1941, during World War Two.

== Current and potential future usage ==
Currently small quantities of pūriri timber are occasionally available around the greater Auckland area and Northland. These tend to be mostly used for wood-turning or, as in the case of pūriri fence posts, be recycled as garden furniture. The erstwhile Forest Research Institute (now Scion) recommends planting fast-growing, high-quality timber species such as pūriri as special-purpose species, particularly in view of the rising cost of importing these and the scarcity of native timber.

A special-purpose species is defined as "a species producing timber with special wood properties required for those uses where radiata pine (Pinus radiata D. Don.) is not entirely satisfactory". Therefore, the timber will usually be complementary to that of Pinus radiata, not an alternative. Some of the special-purpose end uses advocated were; furniture, veneer, turnery, exterior joinery, boat building and tool handles. Pūriri has fulfilled these roles in the past. Other potential roles for pūriri include post, wharf and bridge pilings, as pine requires a high degree of preservative treatment and can break too readily under pressure due to lack of cross-grained wood. Indications are that pūriri could coppice well, and, as it is one of New Zealand's most demanded burning timbers, it might prove suitable as a source of biomass or for charcoal production.
