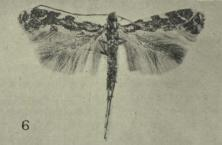

Scientific classification
- Kingdom: Animalia
- Phylum: Arthropoda
- Clade: Pancrustacea
- Class: Insecta
- Order: Lepidoptera
- Family: Gracillariidae
- Genus: Acrocercops
- Species: A. panacifinens

Binomial name
- Acrocercops panacifinens (Watt, 1920)

Synonyms
- Parectopa panacifinens Watt, 1920; Eumetriochroa panacifinens (Watt, 1920)

= Acrocercops panacifinens =

Species of moth

Acrocercops panacifinens or Eumetriochroa panacifinens is a moth of the family Gracillariidae. It is endemic to New Zealand. In 2019 Robert Hoare and colleagues proposed that this species be provisionally assigned to the genus Eumetriochroa.

The wingspan is about 10 mm for females and 8 mm for males. The larvae feed on Neopanax arboreus and probably N. colensoi.

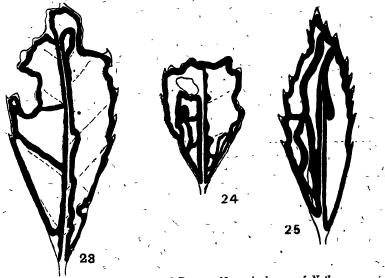
Mine
