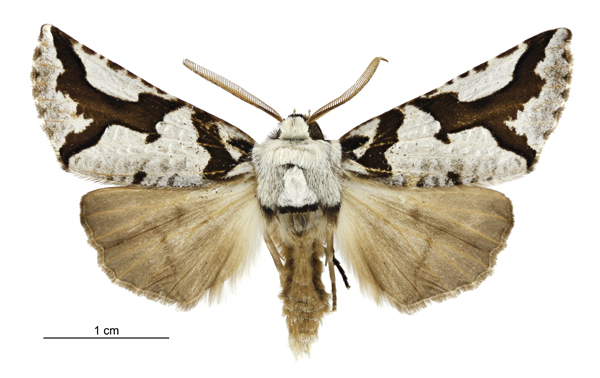
- Male specimen
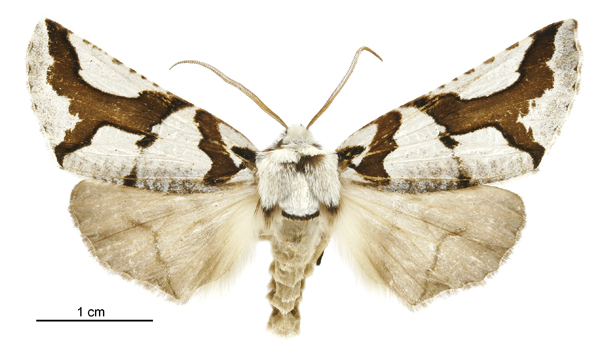
- Female specimen

Scientific classification
- Kingdom: Animalia
- Phylum: Arthropoda
- Clade: Pancrustacea
- Class: Insecta
- Order: Lepidoptera
- Family: Geometridae
- Genus: Ipana
- Species: I. egregia

Binomial name
- Ipana egregia (Felder & Rogenhofer, 1875)

Synonyms
- Declana egregia (Felder & Rogenhofer, 1875); Chlenias egregia Felder & Rogenhofer, 1875

= Ipana egregia =

Species of moth

Ipana egregia, also known as the South Island lichen moth or zebra lichen moth, is a moth in the family Geometridae. This species is endemic to New Zealand. It was first described by entomologists Baron Cajetan von Felder and Alois Friedrich Rogenhofer in 1875 under the name Chlenias egregia.

This species resembles the North Island lichen moth but has fewer and coarser wing markings. It is found only in the South Island and Stewart Island.

The caterpillars of Ipana egregia feed in summer on Araliaceae species, especially five-finger (Neopanax arboreus), mountain five-finger (N. colensoi), and lancewood (Pseudopanax crassifolius). They are well-camouflaged, resembling a small bird-dropping when young and a Pseudopanax fruit when older. Larger larvae, up to 30 mm (1.2 in) long, look like lichen-covered twigs and hold themselves stiffly out from the host plant by their prolegs. The moth overwinters as a pupa on the forest floor, in a loosely-spun cocoon encrusted with dirt.

Adults are attracted to light and have been collected via a mercury vapour light trap.

== Recognition ==
The South Island lichen moth appears on the New Zealand $100 note alongside a mōhua, with a backdrop of Fiordland National Park.
