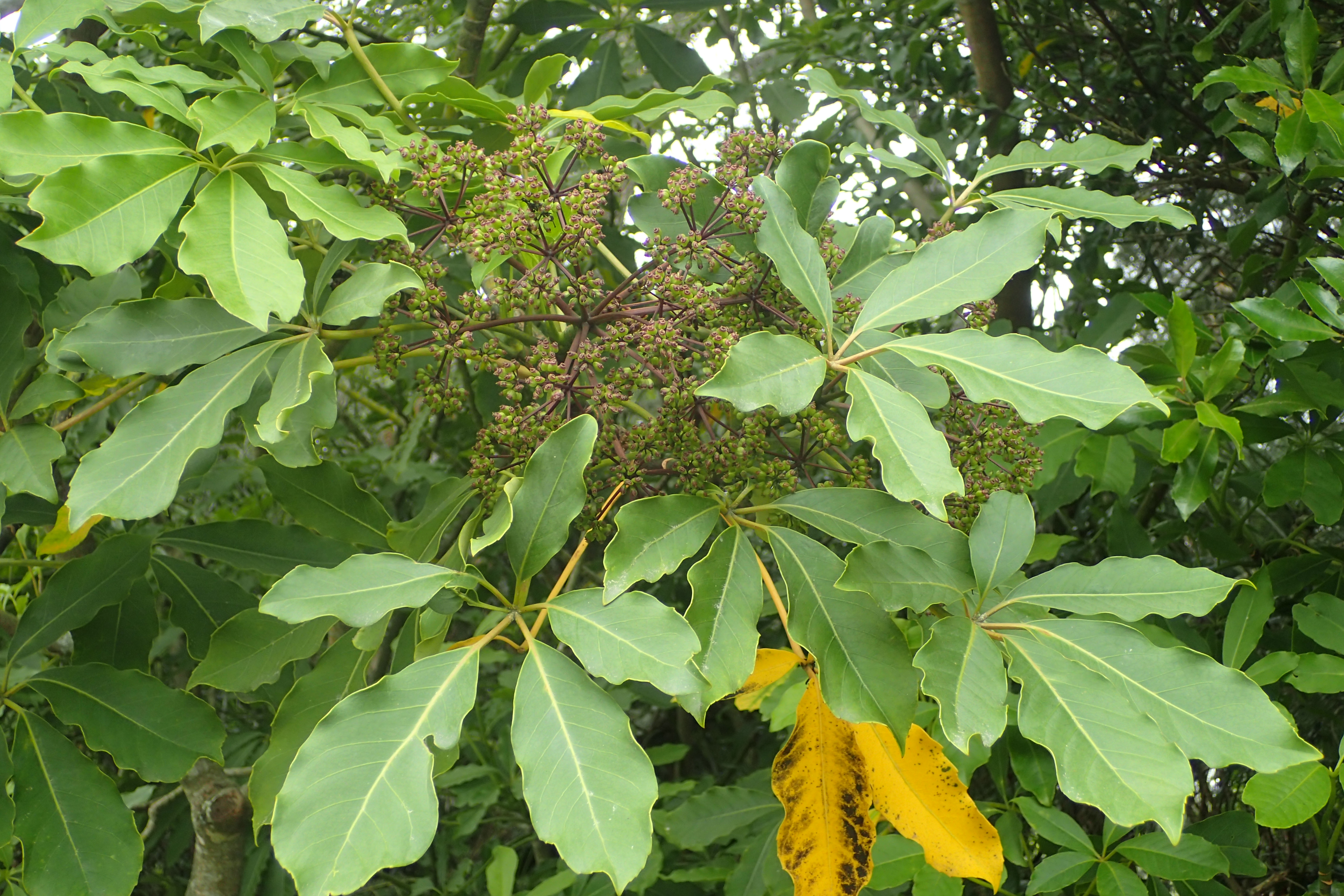
- Pseudopanax kermadecensis

Scientific classification
- Kingdom: Plantae
- Clade: Embryophytes
- Clade: Tracheophytes
- Clade: Angiosperms
- Clade: Eudicots
- Clade: Asterids
- Order: Apiales
- Family: Araliaceae
- Subfamily: Aralioideae
- Genus: Neopanax; Allan

Species
- See text

= Neopanax =

Genus of flowering plants

Neopanax is a genus of flowering plants in the family Araliaceae, native to New Zealand, including the Kermadec Islands. It is a clade within the genus Pseudopanax, and some authorities consider it to be a synonym of Pseudopanax.

== Species ==
Currently accepted species include:

- Pseudopanax arboreus (L.f.) Allan
- Pseudopanax colensoi (Hook.f.) Allan
- Pseudopanax kermadecensis (W.R.B.Oliv.) Allan
- Pseudopanax laetus (Kirk) Allan
- Pseudopanax macintyrei (Cheeseman) Frodin
