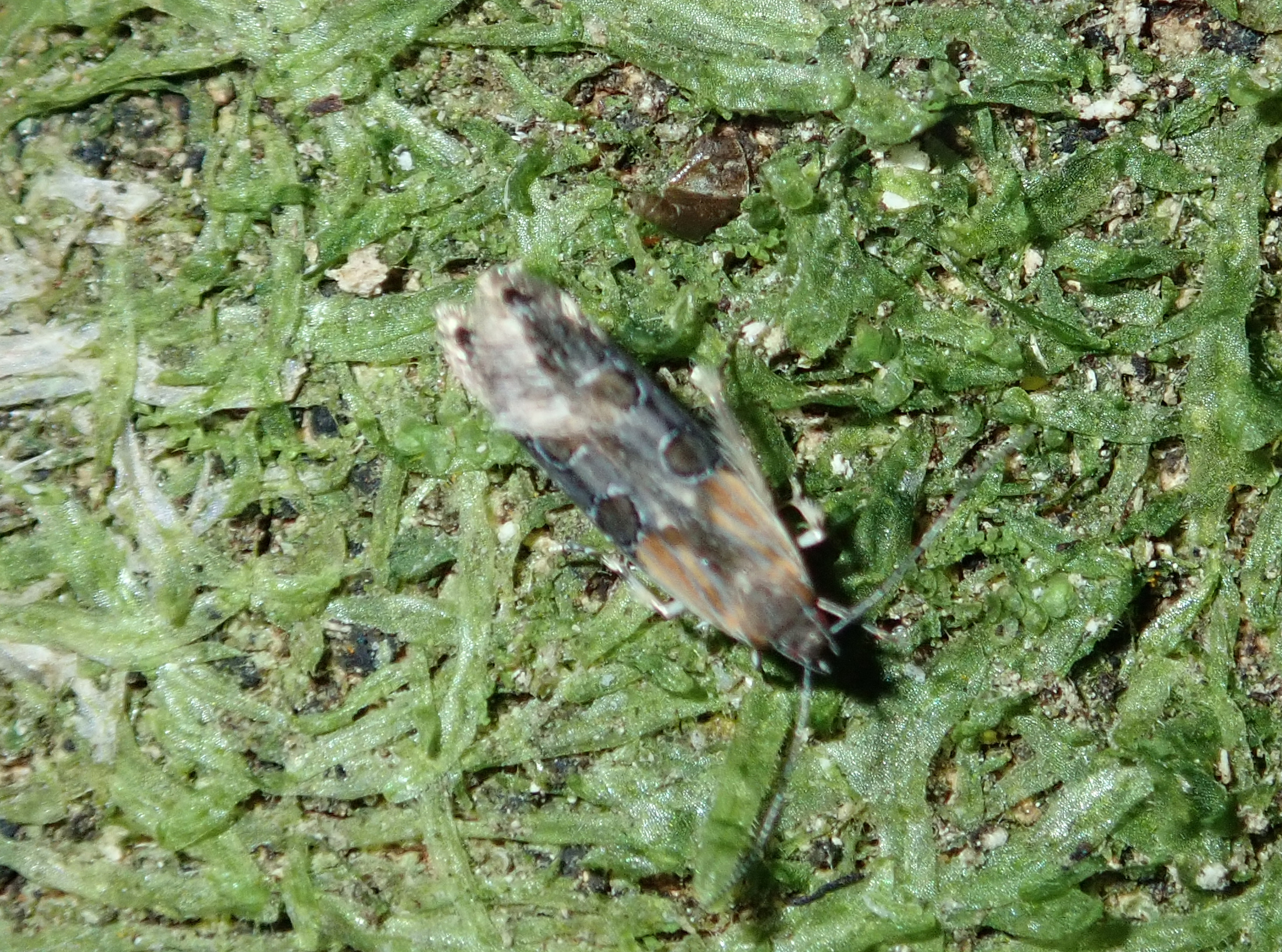

Conservation status
- Naturally Uncommon (NZ TCS)

Scientific classification
- Kingdom: Animalia
- Phylum: Arthropoda
- Class: Insecta
- Order: Lepidoptera
- Family: Blastodacnidae
- Genus: Circoxena
- Species: C. ditrocha

Binomial name
- Circoxena ditrocha Meyrick, 1916

= Circoxena ditrocha =

Species of moth

Circoxena ditrocha is a species of moth in the family Blastodacnidae. This species is endemic to New Zealand and has been collected on both the North and South Islands. The habitat of this species is on the edges of native forest or scrub and it may be associated with Pseudopanax arboreus. As of 2000 the host species of this moth is unknown but it has been hypothesised that the larvae are seed borers. Adults are on the wing in December to March. It is classified as "At Risk, Naturally Uncommon" by the Department of Conservation.

== Taxonomy ==
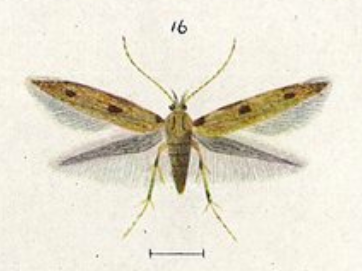
Circoxena ditrocha by George Hudson

This species was first described by Edward Meyrick in 1916 using a specimen collected by George Hudson at Wainuiomata in December. Hudson discussed and illustrated the species in his 1928 publication The butterflies and moths of New Zealand. In 1973 John S. Dugdale discussed the species and illustrated the wing venation as well as the genitalia of both the male and female. The holotype specimen is held at the Natural History Museum, London.

== Description ==
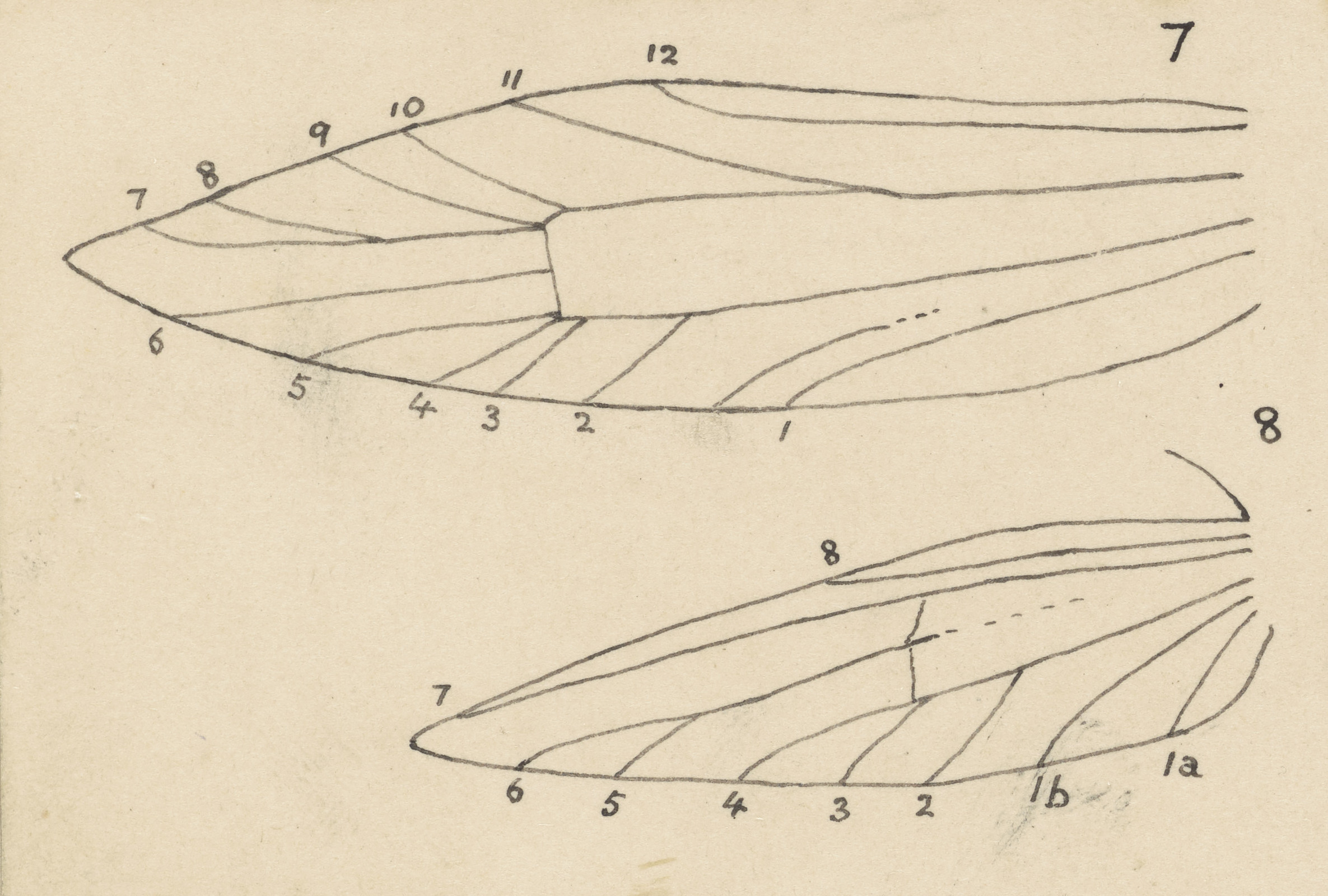
Wing neuration of C. ditrocha.

Meyrick described this species as follows:

♀︎. 11 mm. Head dark shining bronze. Palpi and antennae white lined with black. Thorax dark bronzy-fuscous, external edge of patagia white. Abdomen dark grey. Forewings elongate-lanceolate, fuscous, suffusedly streaked longitudinally with blackish; a fine white longitudinal line just beneath costa on basal fourth, costal edge black; dorsum white towards base; a light yellow-ochreous patch occupying basal third of wing from near costa to fold, marked with three fine whitish longitudinal lines diverging from base; two large fine whitish rings in disc before middle and about 2/3; a small black apical spot preceded by some whitish suffusion : cilia on costa dark grey, basal half barred with ochreous-whitish, on termen ochreous-whitish tinged with grey towards tips and basal area barred with grey. Hindwings grey, becoming dark grey towards apex : cilia whitish-grey.

Alfred Philpott studied and described the male genitalia of the species in 1927.

== Distribution ==
This species is endemic to New Zealand. It has been found from Auckland to Invercargill.

== Biology and behaviour ==
The adults of this species have been found on the wing in December and March. Hudson noted that C. ditrocha was a sluggish flyer and could be collected by sweeping foliage.

== Host plants and habitat ==
The host plants of the larvae of this moth are unknown, but the larva may be a seed borer. Adults of this species prefer habitat at the edges of forest or scrub and appear to be associated with Pseudopanax arboreus.

== Conservation status ==
This species has been classified as having the "At Risk, Naturally Uncommon" conservation status under the New Zealand Threat Classification System.
