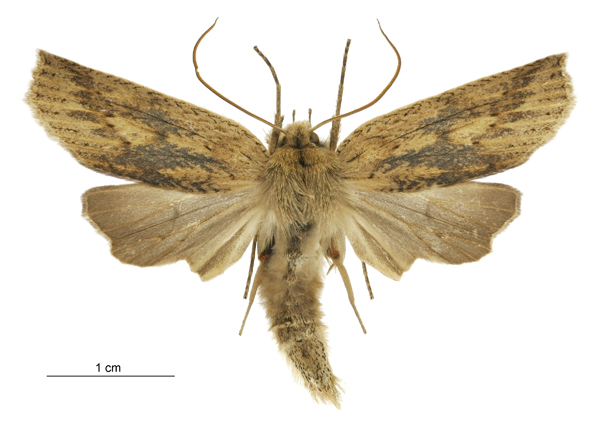
- Ipana leptomera

Scientific classification
- Kingdom: Animalia
- Phylum: Arthropoda
- Clade: Pancrustacea
- Class: Insecta
- Order: Lepidoptera
- Family: Geometridae
- Subfamily: Ennominae
- Genus: Ipana; Walker, 1858

Synonyms
- Detunda Walker, 1865; Politeia Walker, 1865; Amphitape Felder & Rogenhofer, 1875

= Ipana (moth) =

Genus of insects

Ipana is a genus of moths in the family Geometridae that is endemic to New Zealand. The genus was erected by Francis Walker in 1858, synonymised with Declana in 1917, and reinstated in 2023.

== Species ==
Species found in this genus include:

- Ipana atronivea Walker, 1865 – North Island lichen moth
- Ipana egregia Felder & Rogenhofer, 1875 – South Island lichen moth
- Ipana feredayi (Butler, 1877)
- Ipana glacialis Hudson, 1903
- Ipana griseata (Hudson, 1898)
- Ipana halocarpi Dugdale & Emmerson, 2023
- Ipana hermione (Hudson, 1898)
- Ipana junctilinea Walker, 1865
- Ipana leptomera Walker, 1858
- Ipana perdita Dugdale & Emmerson, 2023
