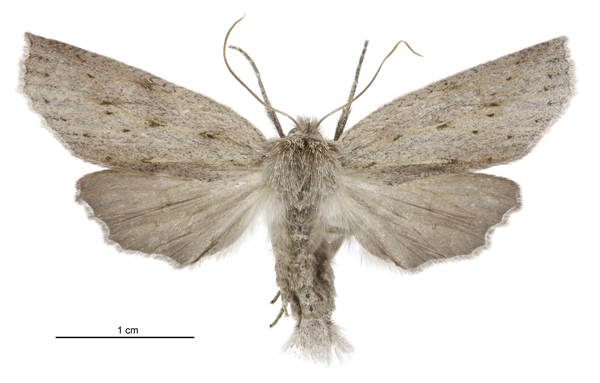
- Female
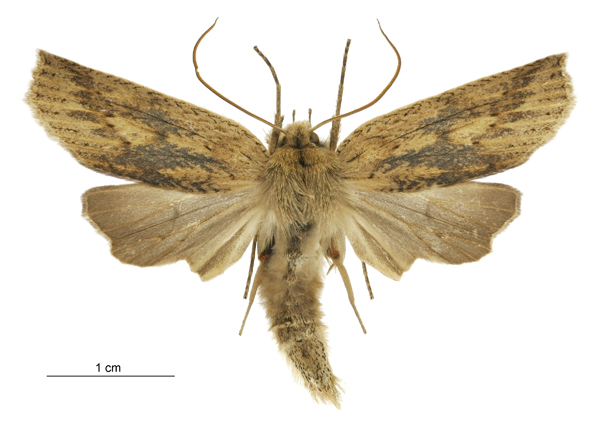
- Male

Scientific classification
- Kingdom: Animalia
- Phylum: Arthropoda
- Clade: Pancrustacea
- Class: Insecta
- Order: Lepidoptera
- Family: Geometridae
- Genus: Ipana
- Species: I. leptomera

Binomial name
- Ipana leptomera Walker, 1858

Synonyms
- Declana leptomera (Walker, 1858); Amphitape crassitibia Felder & Rogenhofer, 1875

= Ipana leptomera =

Species of moth endemic to New Zealand

Ipana leptomera is a species of moth in the family Geometridae. It is endemic to New Zealand. Originally described by Francis Walker in 1858, the species was moved to the genus Declana in 1898. In 2023, the genus Ipana was reinstated, with Ipana leptomera becoming the type species.

== Description ==
Ipana leptomera can be distinguished from other moths due to its three-lobed hindwings, and its herringbone fine streak pattern. Males of the species are yellow-tan, while females are grey.

== Behaviour ==
The species can be found on a wide range of trees and shrubs (both native and introduced fauna), including conifer trees, and suburban garden vegetation. The species is on the wing typically between September and March. Aduts are attracted to light and have been collected via a mercury vapour light trap.

== Distribution ==
The species is found on mainland New Zealand, as well as the Chatham Islands.
