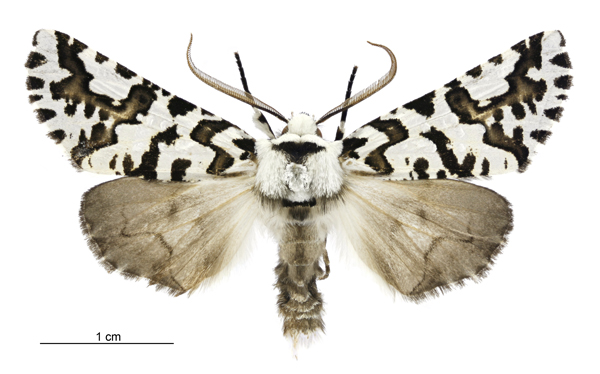
- Male specimen
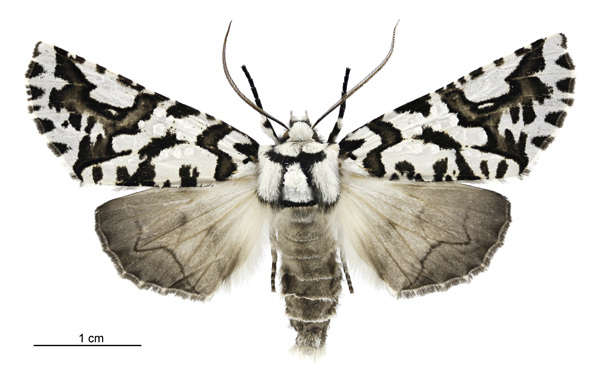
- Female specimen

Scientific classification
- Kingdom: Animalia
- Phylum: Arthropoda
- Class: Insecta
- Order: Lepidoptera
- Family: Geometridae
- Genus: Ipana
- Species: I. atronivea

Binomial name
- Ipana atronivea (Walker, 1865)

Synonyms
- Detunda atronivea Walker, 1865; Declana atronivea (Walker, 1865); Chlenias manxifera Fereday, 1880; Declana manxifera (Fereday, 1880)

= Ipana atronivea =

Species of moth

Ipana atronivea, commonly called the North Island lichen moth or North Island zebra moth, is a moth of the family Geometridae. It is endemic to New Zealand and found only in the North Island.

== Taxonomy ==
Ipana atronivea was first described by Frances Walker in 1865 as Detunda atronivea. In 1880 R. W. Fereday, thinking he was describing a new species, named this moth Chlenias anxifera. In 1884 Edward Meyrick redescribed the species and synonymised Chlenias anxifera with Detunda atronivea. In 1900 Charles Swinhoe placed this species in the genus Declana. In 2023, the species was moved to the newly reinstated genus Ipana. The male holotype specimen, collected by Captain Parry in Wellington, is held at the Natural History Museum, London.

== Description ==
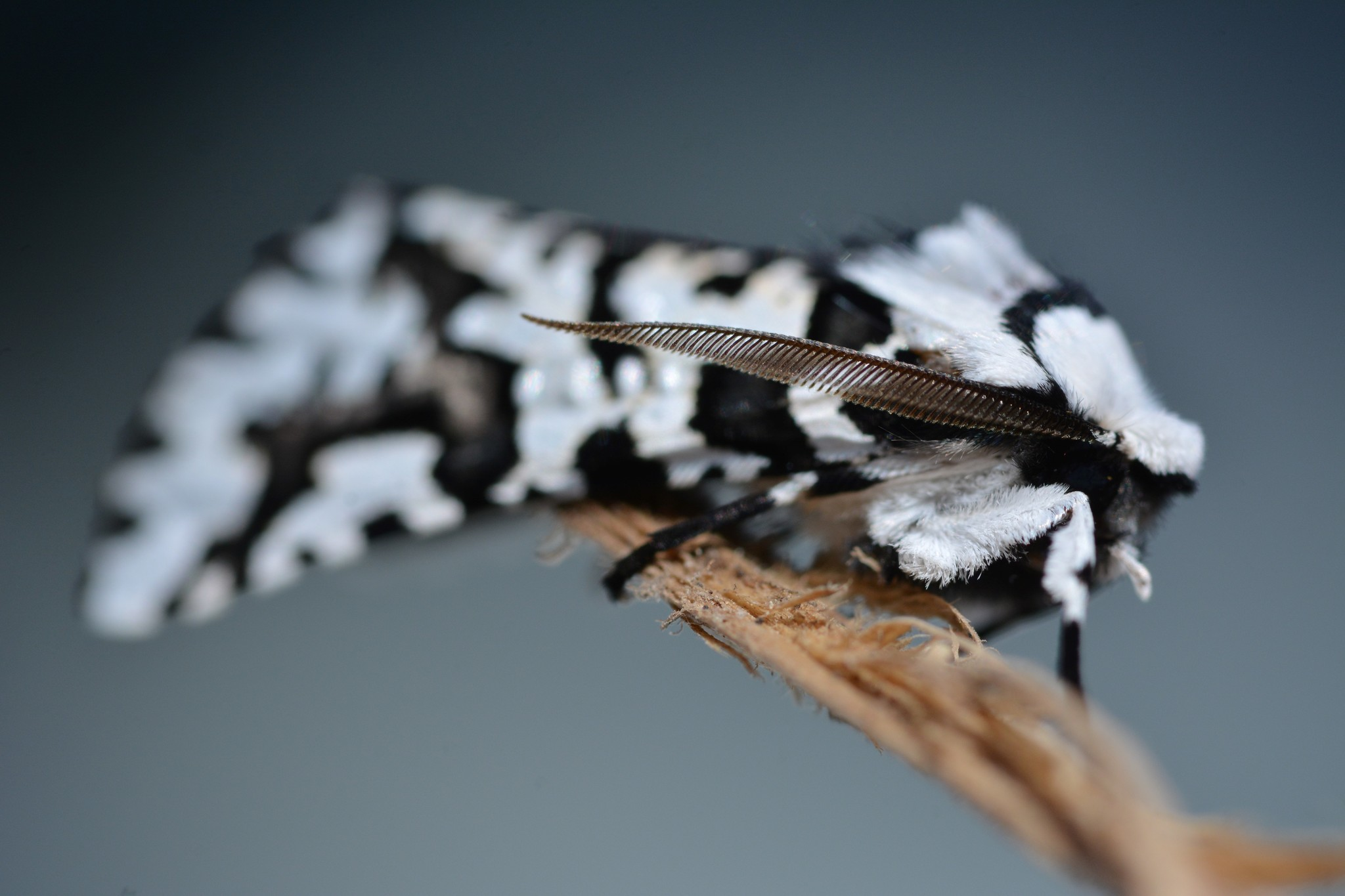
Male Ipana atronivea

The larvae have a lumpy appearance and are brown and brownish-white in colour, growing to approximately 30 mm (1.2 in). In the early stages of their life they look similar to a bird dropping when curled on a leaf. When an adult Ipana atronivea has a wingspan of between 40–45 mm (1.6–1.8 in).

This moth is white with dark brown or black markings. It is very similar in appearance to its close relation the South Island lichen moth, Ipana egregia, but it has fewer dark markings and does not have the dark edges on the forewing. This gives Ipana atronivea a more mottled appearance; it also has a black rectangular mark on the back of the thorax.

Hudson noted that Ipana atronivea "varies considerably in the size and shape of the black markings on the fore-wings, which are often slightly different on the opposite sides, in the same specimen." One authority has claimed that Ipana atronivea is the only one of 180,000 Lepidoptera species with asymmetrical patterning: its wings are not mirror images of each other.

Research has indicated that the forewing colouration of this species is much more likely to protect the moth against predation when the adult insect is at rest on lichen compared to when it is resting on bare tree trunks.

== Distribution and habitat ==
This species is endemic to New Zealand and is found in the North Island. In 1913 it was regarded as being rare in Whanganui region but was noted as being very common about Mount Taranaki and Mount Ruapehu. It has also been found in Wellington, Ōtaki and Napier.

== Life stages ==
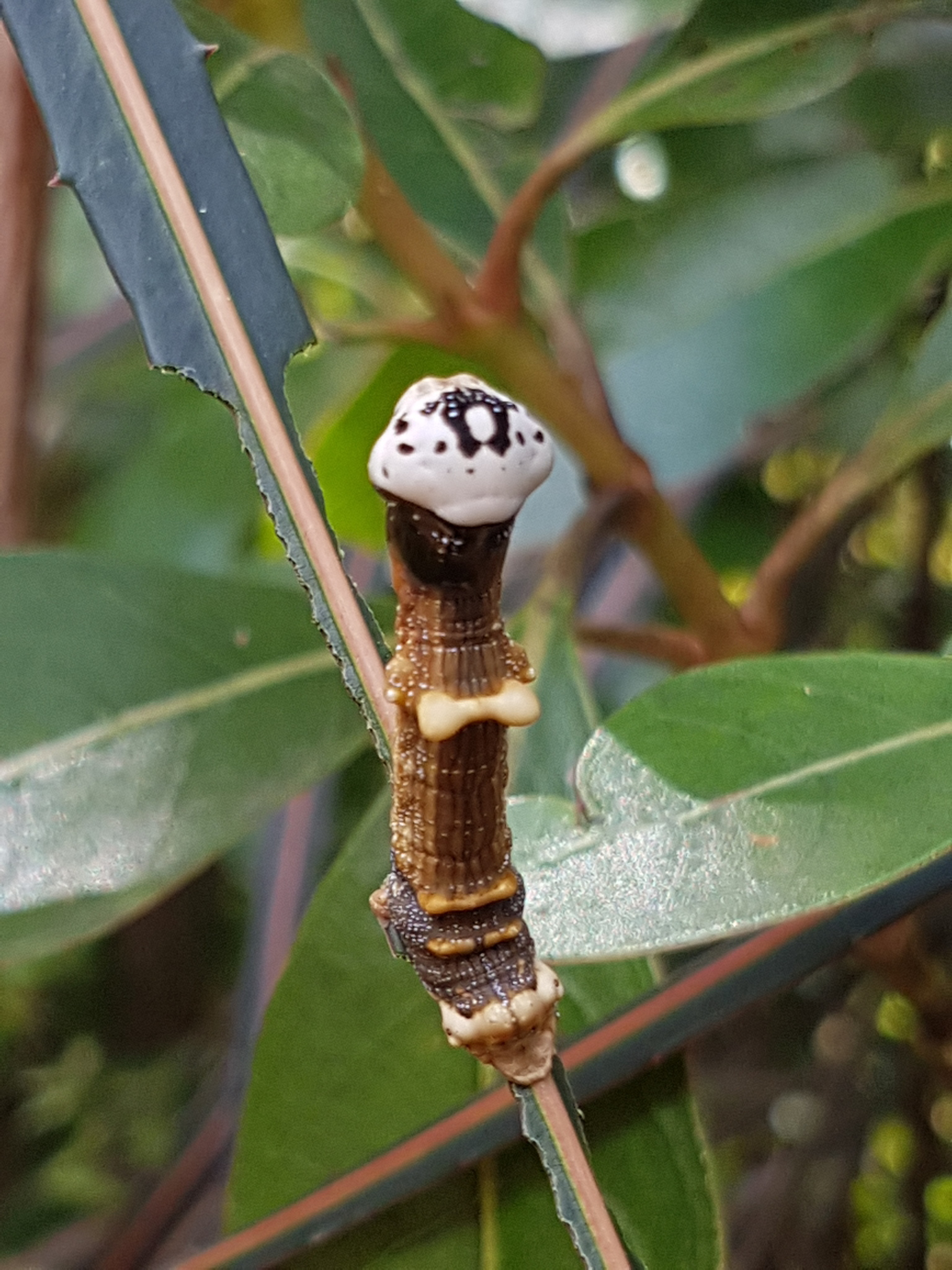
Caterpillar of Ipana atronivea feeding on Pseudopanax crassifolius.

The eggs of Ipana atronivea are laid from the end of October. They are oval in shape, slightly roughened on their surface and start out green in colour, turning a light blue shade covered with purple spots after approximately a week and then to a light purple colour just prior to hatching. The eggs are laid singularly and hatch after 11 days. Although the larvae are generally brownish or blackish green in colour they can vary in shade significantly. The pupae inhabit a light coloured cocoon which they form amongst leaves on the surface of the ground. The adults emerge in February and March. Some overwinter as pupae while others transform into adult moths.

== Host plant ==
The host plants of the caterpillars of Ipana atronivea are Araliaceae including Neopanax arboreus (now Pseudopanax arboreus) and Pseudopanax crassifolius.

== Gallery ==
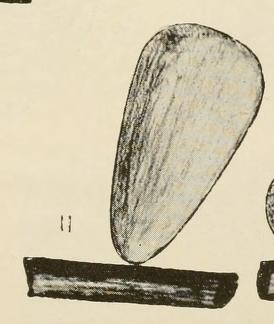
Illustration of egg of species

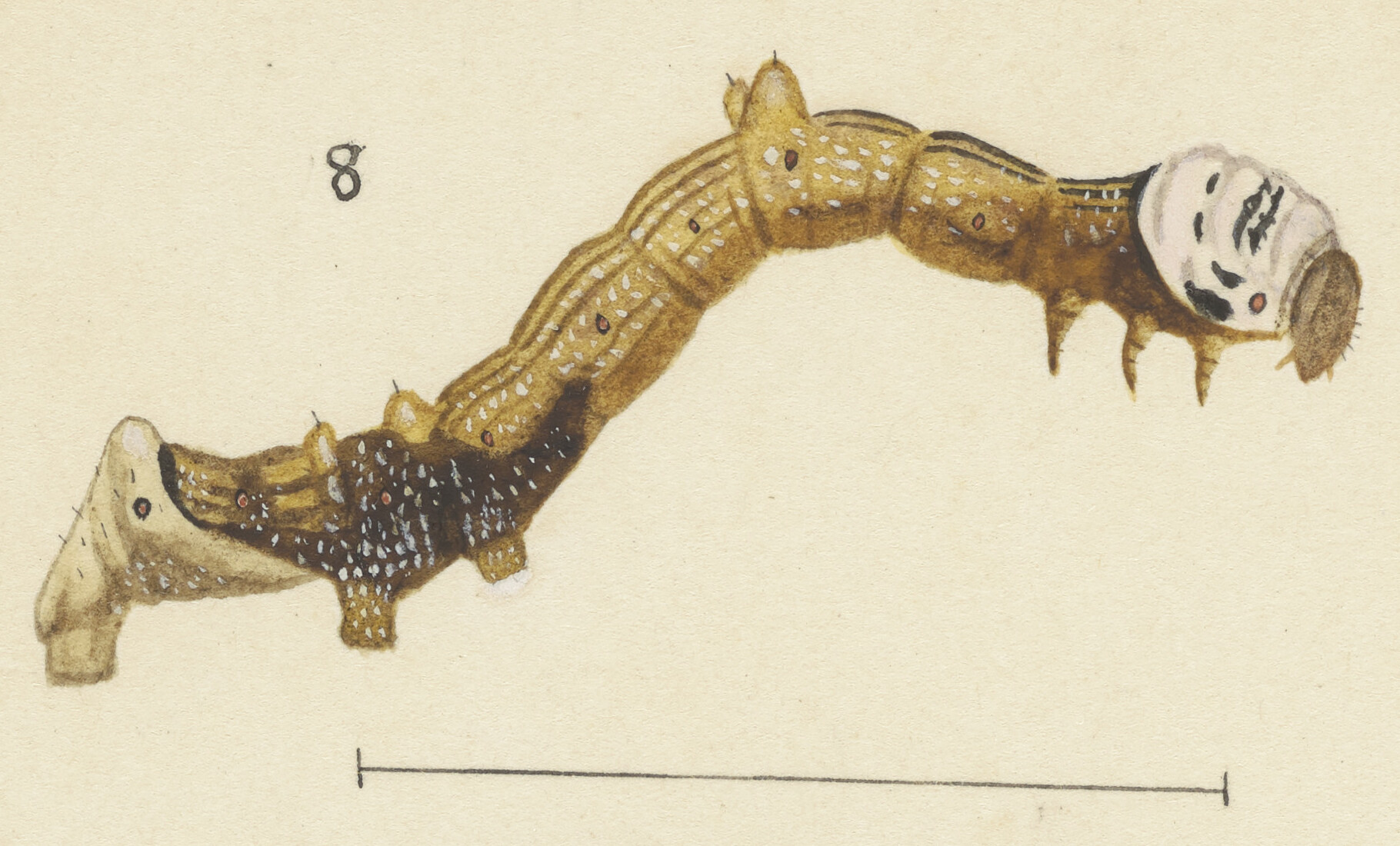
Illustration of larva of species

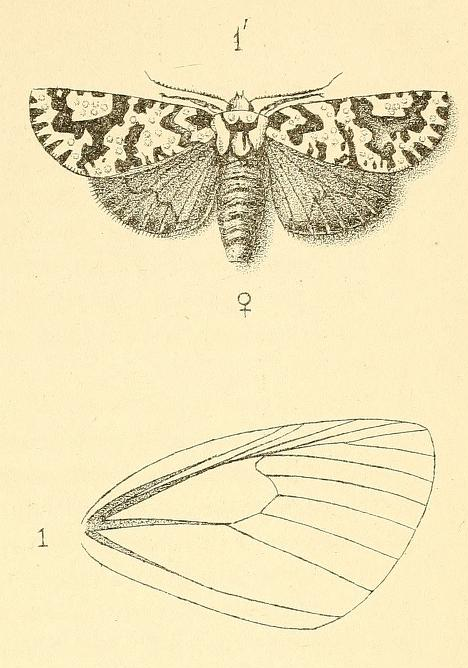
1880 illustration of female by Fereday

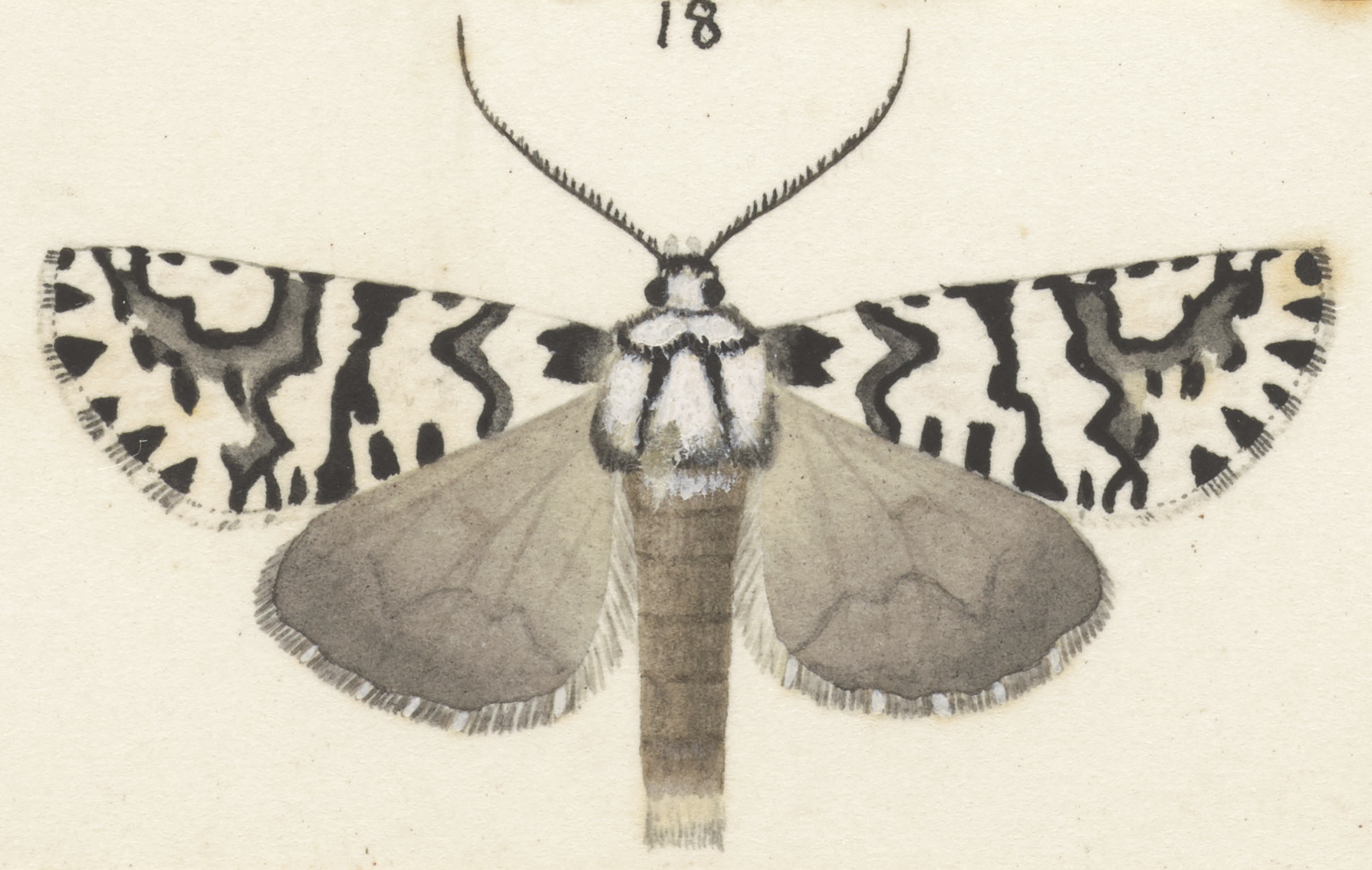
Illustration of male by Hudson
