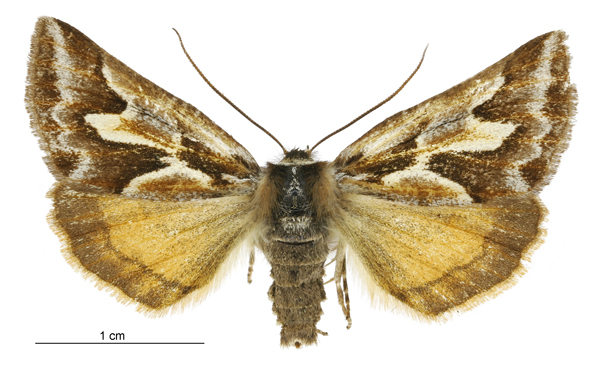
- Female
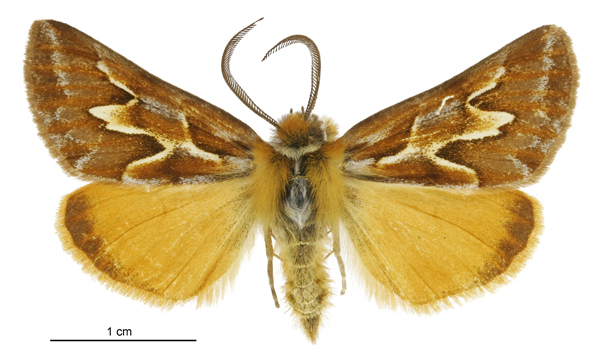
- Male

Scientific classification
- Kingdom: Animalia
- Phylum: Arthropoda
- Clade: Pancrustacea
- Class: Insecta
- Order: Lepidoptera
- Family: Geometridae
- Genus: Ipana
- Species: I. glacialis

Binomial name
- Ipana glacialis (Hudson, 1903)

Synonyms
- Declana glacialis Hudson, 1898

= Ipana glacialis =

Species of moth endemic to New Zealand

Ipana glacialis is a species of moth in the family Geometridae. This species was first described by George Hudson in 1903. It is endemic to New Zealand and is found in the central and western parts of the South Island. This species inhabits open country at the alpine zone. Adults are on the wing

== Taxonomy ==
This species was first described by George Hudson in 1903 and originally named Declana glacialis. George Hudson again discussed and illustrated this species in his 1928 book The butterflies and moths of New Zealand under that name. In 2023 this species was placed in the genus Ipana. The male lectotype, collected by Hudson at the Sealey Range in the Mackenzie High Country, is held at Te Papa.

== Description ==
The wingspan of this species ranges between 27 and 35 mm. Hudson described this species as follows:

The expansion of the wings is about 1 1/4 in. The fore wings are very dark rich reddish-brown ; there is a large, very irregular, deeply indented white mark in the middle of thewing extending from the base beyond 3/4. This marking is almost bisected by a bright reddish-brown longitudinal streak. There is an obscure bluish-grey shading near the termen, and the veins and cilia are bright reddish-brown. The apex of the fore wings is rather prominent and the termen somewhat arched. The hind wings are bright-orange, with several large brown spots on the termen near the apex ; the cilia are bright-orange. The head and thorax are orange-brown. There is a conspicuous ochreous band on the prothorax, and the abdomen is dull-orange, speckled with black towards the tip.

== Distribution ==
I. glacialis is endemic to New Zealand and is found in the central and western parts of the South Island.

== Habitat ==
This species inhabits open country in the alpine zone.

== Behaviour ==
Adults are on the wing from November until January. This species is day flying. The male is a rapid flyer during hot sunshine, particularly in the late afternoon. The female is rarer and less active.
