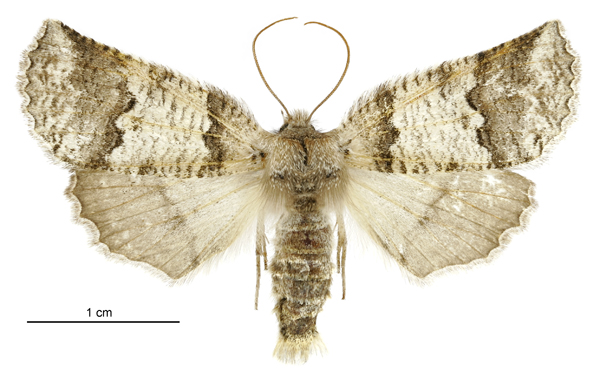
- Female
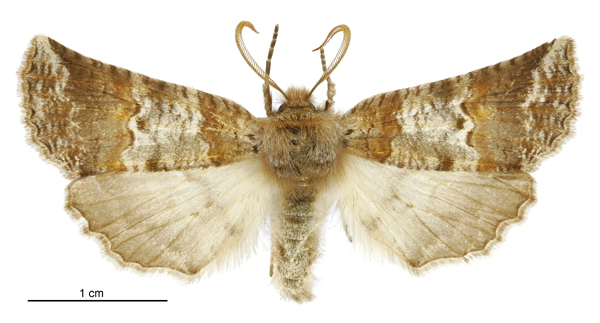
- Male

Scientific classification
- Kingdom: Animalia
- Phylum: Arthropoda
- Clade: Pancrustacea
- Class: Insecta
- Order: Lepidoptera
- Family: Geometridae
- Genus: Ipana
- Species: I. feredayi

Binomial name
- Ipana feredayi (Butler, 1877)

Synonyms
- Declana feredayi Butler, 1877; Declana sinuosa Philpott, 1915

= Ipana feredayi =

Species of moth endemic to New Zealand

Ipana feredayi is a species of moth in the family Geometridae. This species was first described by Arthur Gardiner Butler in 1877. It is endemic to New Zealand and has been found in both the North and South Islands were its host plants, New Zealand southern beech trees, are present. I. feredayi frequents its favoured habitat at altitudes from sea level up to 1,350 metres (4,430 ft). The mature larva have a twig like appearance which mimics the branches of their host plants Nothofagus menziesii, Nothofagus cliffortioides, Nothofagus fusca, Nothofagus solandri and Nothofagus truncata. The colouration of the larvae depends upon which host plant they feed. Adults are on the wing from August until March and are attracted to light. Adults pollinate Hoheria Iyallii.

== Taxonomy ==
This species was first described by Arthur Gardiner Butler in 1877 and was originally named Declana feredayi. Edward Meyrick in 1883 and 1884 synonymised D. feredayi with Declana floccosa. In his 1898 book New Zealand moths and butterflies (Macro-lepidoptera), George Hudson, followed Meyrick, and discussed this species as a synonym of D. floccosa. In 1915 Alfred Philpott, thinking he was describing a new species, named this moth Declana sinuosa. In 1927 Louis Beethoven Prout synonymised this name with D. feredayi. In 1928 Hudson discussed and illustrated this moth as a species under the name Delana feredayi in his book The butterflies and moths of New Zealand. In 2023 John S. Dugdale, Alan W. Emmerson and Robert Hoare reconsidered the placement of this species and placed it in the genus Ipana. The male holotype, collected by John Davies Enys at Castle Hill, is held at the Natural History Museum, London.

== Description ==
Adult at rest.

Butler originally described this species as follows:

Primaries shining pinky grey, crossed by innumerable short black lines; two widely separated irregularly zigzag central black lines, indicating a broad central band, which is relieved on each side by ferruginous ; external area (commencing in an oblique line from the apex) silvery; a regularly zigzag marginal line; fringe greyish brown; secondaries pale grey; margin and fringe as in primaries ; thorax dark grey, varied with ferruginous; abdomen pale grey: wings and body below pale grey; primaries with the costa whitish, spotted with dark grey; fringe and margin as above. Expanse of wings 1 inch 6 lines.

Hudson described this species as follows:

The expansion of the wings is about 1 3/8 inches. It differs from Declana floccosa in the following respects: The thorax in the male has a median crest, usually of darker colour than the rest of the body, and a slight crest is present in the female; the minute stripes on the costa are longer; the first line is further from the base, slightly inwardly oblique and almost straight, the second line is indented above and below the middle and the costal edge is strongly arched at the base and widely sinuate to the apex.

Hudson pointed out that this species is variable in appearance. This species can be distinguished from others in the Ipana genus as it has a pale median band that is thinner at the costa than at the dorsum.

The mature larva of I. feredayi have a twig like appearance which mimics their host plant. The colouration of the larvae depends on the host plant they are feeding from. The larvae that feed on Nothofagus menziesii and Nothofagus cliffortioides are frequently darker in colour than larvae that feed on Nothofagus fusca.

== Distribution ==
I. feredayi is endemic to New Zealand. It has been observed in the North and South Islands where its host plants, species of New Zealand southern beech trees, can be found. The species frequents its favoured habitat at altitudes from sea level up to 1,350 metres (4,430 ft).

== Habitat and hosts ==
This species inhabits native beech forest. The larval host plants for this moth include N. menziesii, N. cliffortioides, N. fusca, N. solandri, and N. truncata.

== Behaviour ==
Adults are on the wing from August until March and are attracted to light. They have been collected via a mercury vapour light trap. Adults of this species pollinate Hoheria Iyallii.
