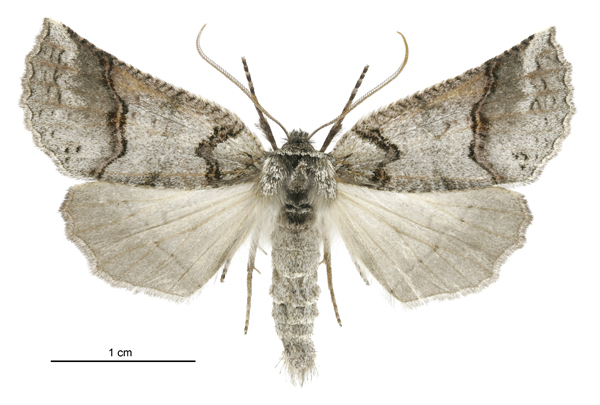
- Female
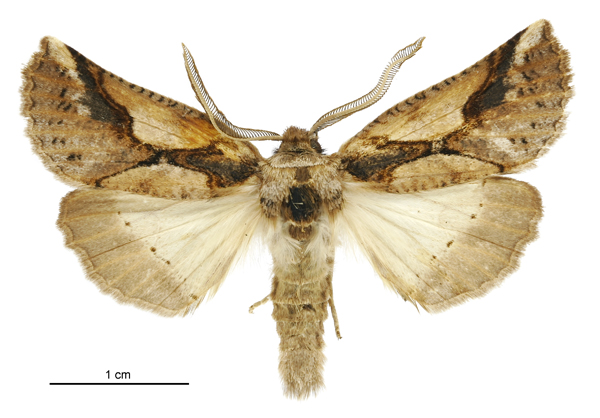
- Male

Scientific classification
- Kingdom: Animalia
- Phylum: Arthropoda
- Clade: Pancrustacea
- Class: Insecta
- Order: Lepidoptera
- Family: Geometridae
- Genus: Ipana
- Species: I. junctilinea

Binomial name
- Ipana junctilinea (Walker, 1865)

Synonyms
- Declana junctilinea (Walker, 1865); Politeia junctilinea Walker, 1865

= Ipana junctilinea =

Species of moth endemic to New Zealand

Ipana junctilinea is a species of moth in the family Geometridae. It is endemic to New Zealand. Adults of this species pollinate Dracophyllum acerosum and Leptospermum scoparium. They are attracted to light and have been collected via a mercury vapour light trap.
