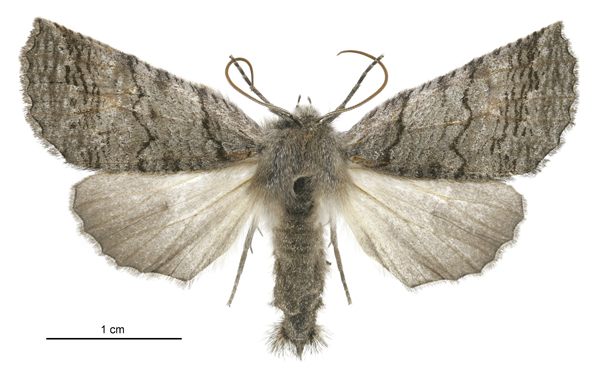
- Female
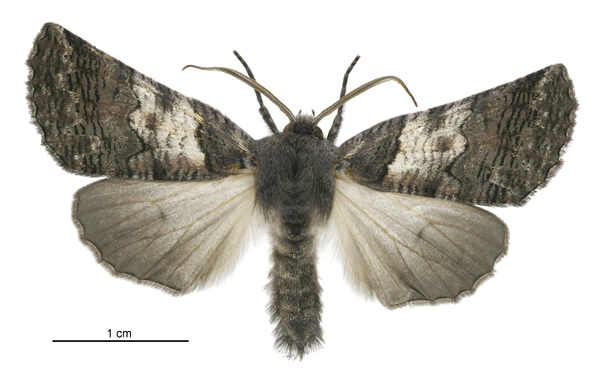
- Male

Scientific classification
- Kingdom: Animalia
- Phylum: Arthropoda
- Clade: Pancrustacea
- Class: Insecta
- Order: Lepidoptera
- Family: Geometridae
- Genus: Ipana
- Species: I. griseata

Binomial name
- Ipana griseata (Hudson, 1898)

Synonyms
- Declana griseata Hudson, 1898

= Ipana griseata =

Species of moth

Ipana griseata is a species of moth in the family Geometridae. It is endemic to New Zealand. This species is classified as "At Risk, Declining" by the Department of Conservation.

== Taxonomy ==
Ipana griseata was first described and illustrated by George Vernon Hudson in 1898 as Declana griseata. Hudson further discussed and illustrated the species both in his 1928 and 1939 publications. The lectotype specimen is held at the Museum of New Zealand Te Papa Tongarewa. In 2023, the species was placed in the genus Ipana.

== Description ==
=== Larva ===
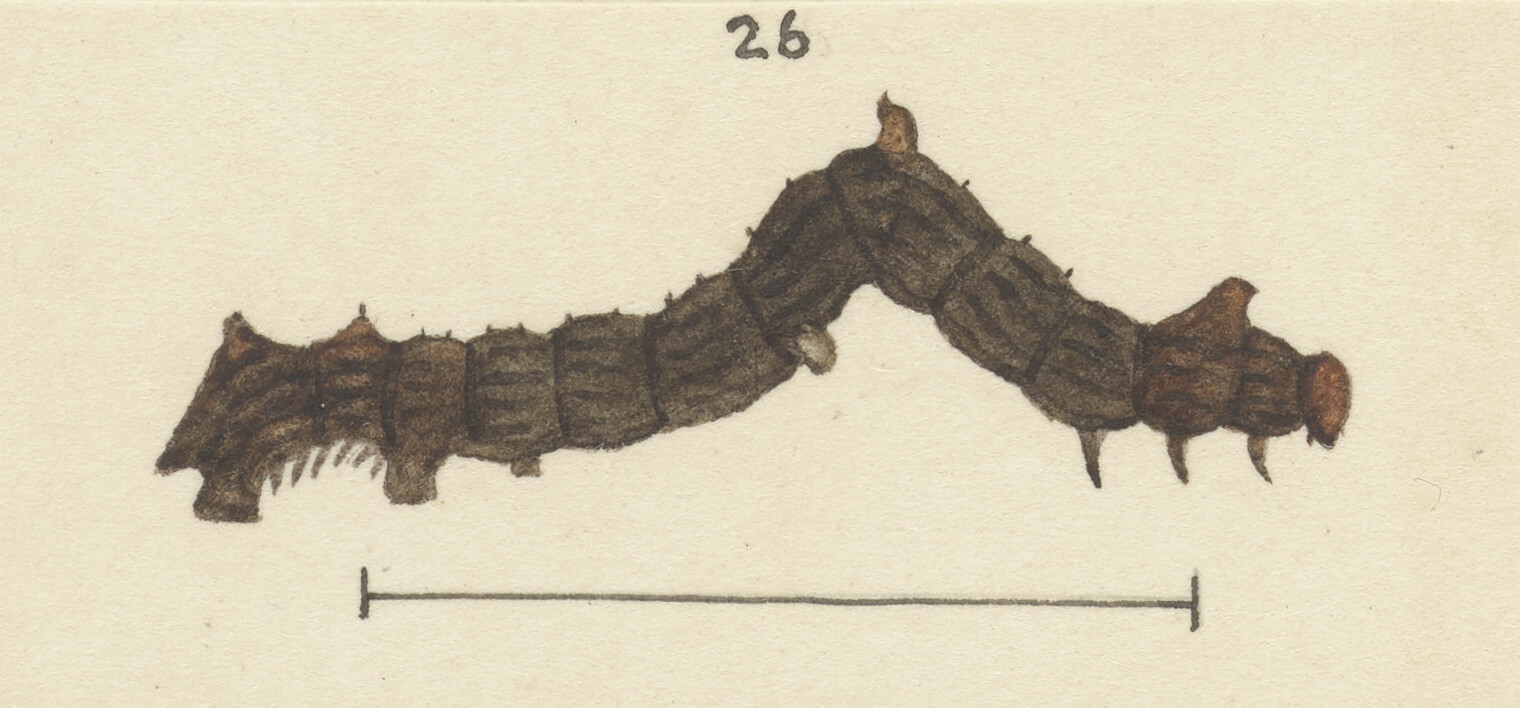
Illustration of larva.

Hudson gave a description and illustration of the larvae of this species in his 1939 publication. In appearance the larvae are extremely variable but it is able to mimic the appearance of a twig on its host plant.

=== Pupa ===
The pupa are enclosed in a cocoon made of moss and plant detritus and can be found on the ground.

=== Adult ===
Hudson described the adult moth as follows:

The expansion of the wings of the male is 1 1/8 inches, of the female 1 3/8 inches. The fore-wings are dull slaty-grey, with a slightly paler central band; there is a fine oblique wavy transverse line at about one-fourth, another at about one-half, and indications of a third at about three-fourths; numerous minute black streaks are thickly scattered over the wing, especially near the base and the termen; the outline of the termen is very slightly scalloped. The hind-wings are pale grey, darker near the termen. The body is very dark slaty-grey. The antenna of the male are not bi-pectinated.

The adult of this species can be distinguished from related other species in the genera Ipana and Declana as it has a torso that is more downy in appearance and has a light coloured band that appears before the middle of the forewings. It can be distinguished from grey forms of Declana floccosa and D. nigrospara as I. griseata is darker grey in colour and is larger than the other two species.

== Distribution ==
Ipana griseata is endemic to New Zealand. This species range is from the Bay of Plenty/Taupo down to Stewart Island. However it is likely locally extinct in some North Island localities.

Ipana griseata has been recorded as being collected in Wellington, Top house at Lake Rotoiti, Mount Hutt, Castle Hill, Cave Creek in Paparoa National Park, Arthurs Pass, Waiho Gorge in Westland, Dunedin, Ben Lomond, Lake Wakatipu, Takitimu Mountains in Southland, Invercargill and Orepuki.

== Biology and behaviour ==
The larvae of Ipana griseata are present in December and January. The adult moths emerge from February. Adults of this species are on the wing all year round. They are attracted to light and have been collected via a mercury vapour light trap. Adults rest on mossy tree trunks in the vicinity of their host plants. Host species

The host species of this moth are leafy mistletoes, including Peraxilla colensoi, P. tetrapetala, Ileostylus microanthus, and Tupeia antarctica.

== Conservation status ==
This moth is classified under the New Zealand Threat Classification system as being "At Risk, Declining". The species was regarded by Hudson as being scarce even when first described. The survival of this moth is dependent on the survival of its host plants.
