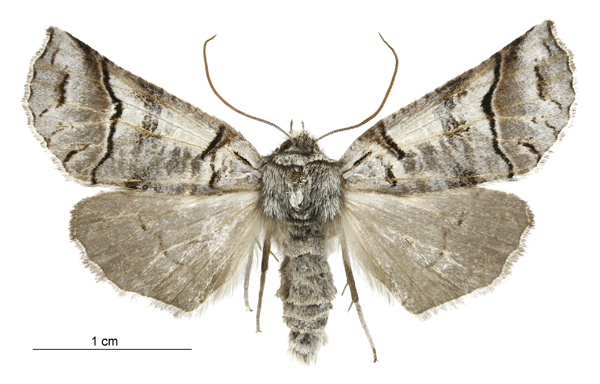
- Female
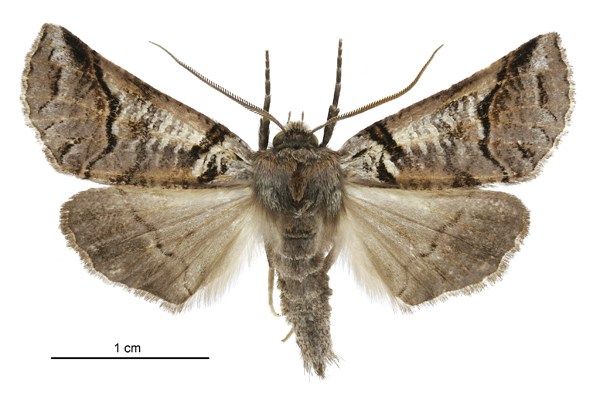
- Male

Scientific classification
- Domain: Eukaryota
- Kingdom: Animalia
- Phylum: Arthropoda
- Class: Insecta
- Order: Lepidoptera
- Family: Geometridae
- Genus: Ipana
- Species: I. hermione

Binomial name
- Ipana hermione (Hudson, 1898)

Synonyms
- Declana hermione Hudson, 1898

= Ipana hermione =

Species of moth endemic to New Zealand

Ipana hermione is a species of moth in the family Geometridae. It is endemic to New Zealand.
