= Ipana perdita =

Scientific classification
- Kingdom: Animalia
- Phylum: Arthropoda
- Class: Insecta
- Order: Lepidoptera
- Family: Geometridae
- Genus: Ipana
- Species: I. perdita

Binomial name
- Ipana perdita Dugdale and Emmerson, 2023

Species of moth endemic to New Zealand

Ipana perdita is a moth of the family Geometridae. It is endemic to New Zealand.
