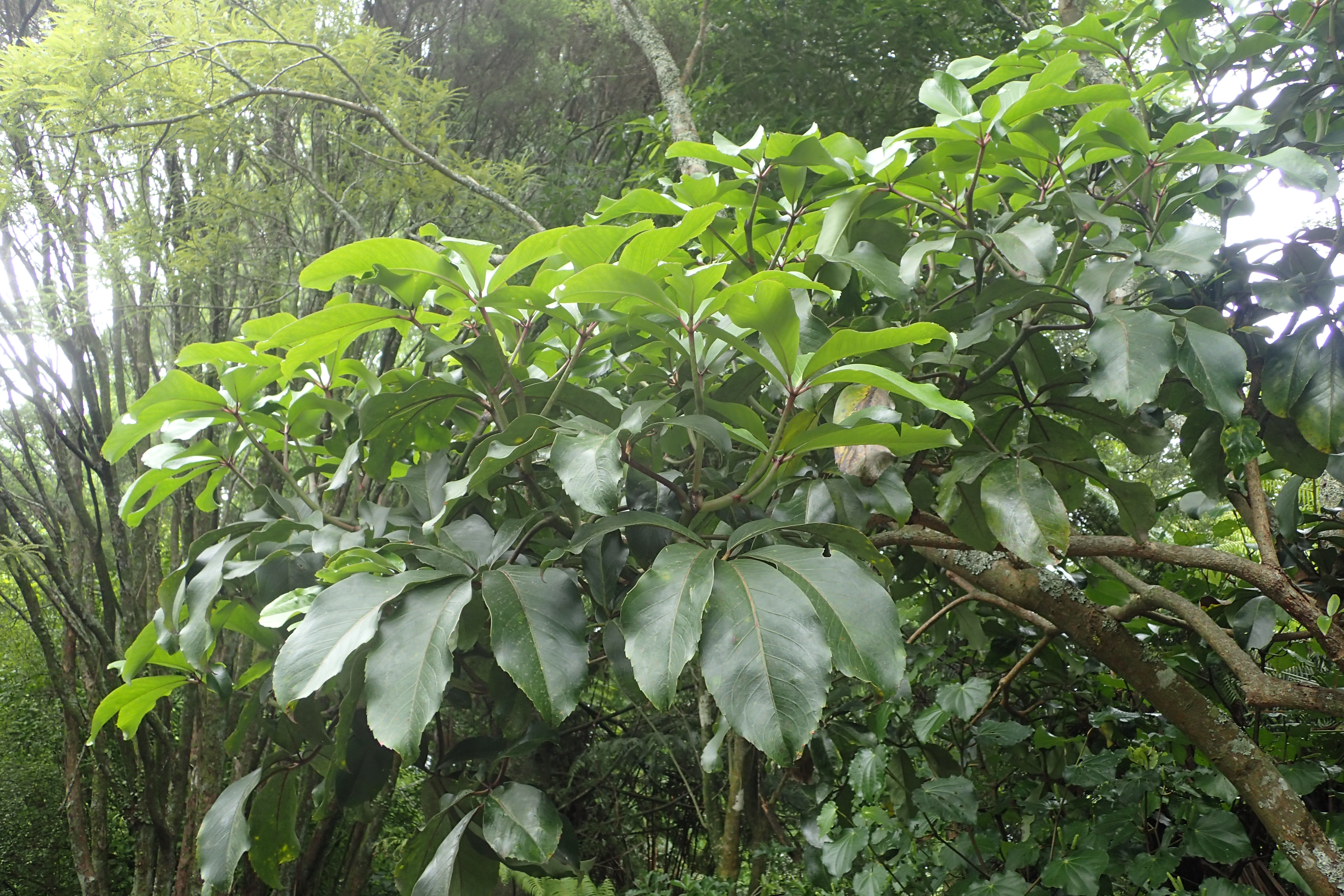
- Leaves
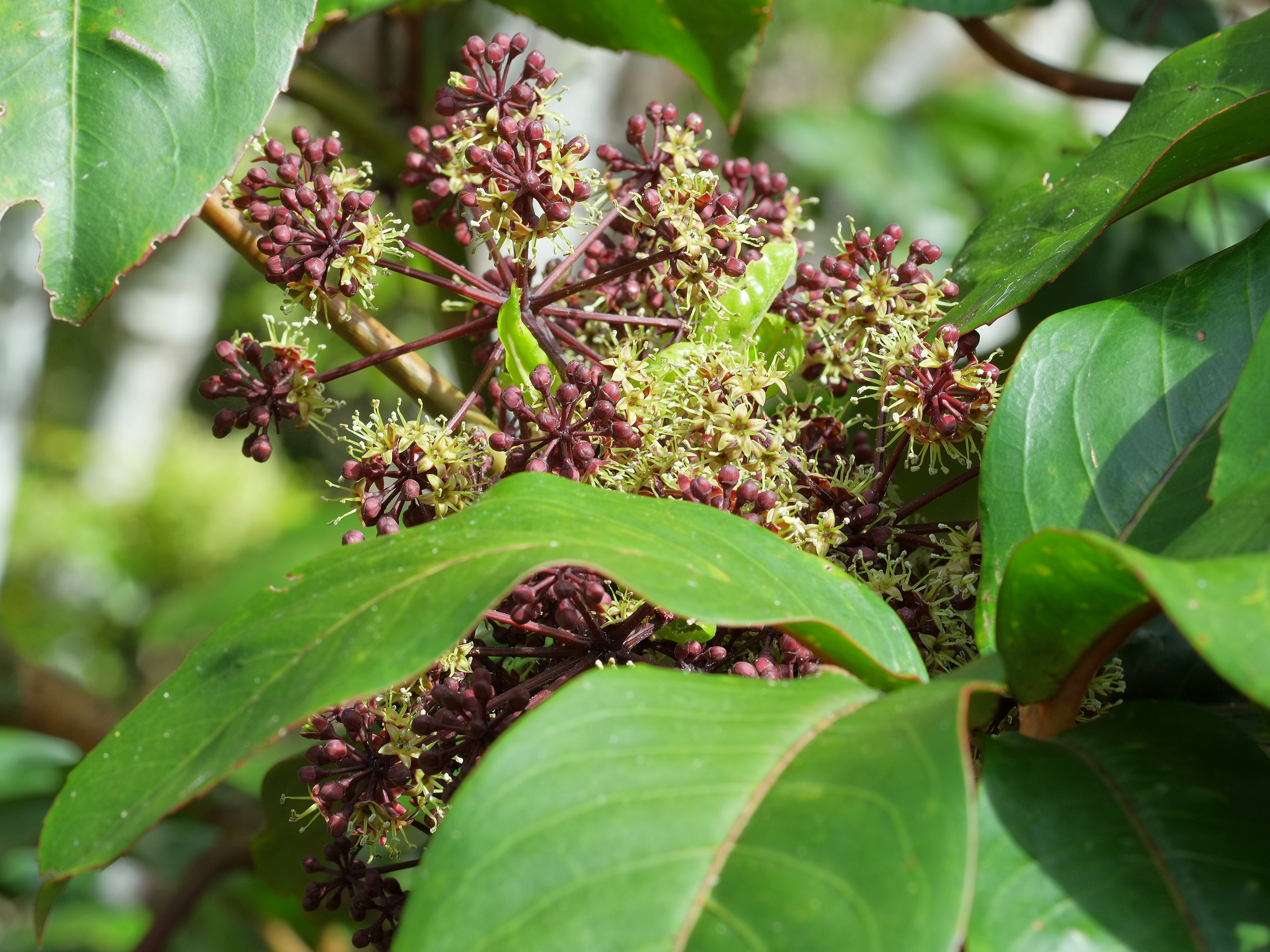
- Flowers

Conservation status
- Declining (NZ TCS)

Scientific classification
- Kingdom: Plantae
- Clade: Embryophytes
- Clade: Tracheophytes
- Clade: Angiosperms
- Clade: Eudicots
- Clade: Asterids
- Order: Apiales
- Family: Araliaceae
- Genus: Pseudopanax
- Species: P. laetus

Binomial name
- Pseudopanax laetus (Kirk) Philipson

Synonyms
- Neopanax laetus (Kirk) Allan; Nothopanax laetus (Kirk) Cheeseman

= Pseudopanax laetus =

Species of flowering plant

Pseudopanax laetus, the shrub panax, is a species of flowering plant in the subfamily Aralioideae, family Araliaceae, native to the North Island of New Zealand. It is a member of the Neopanax clade, and occasionally referred to as Neopanax laetus. It has gained the Royal Horticultural Society's Award of Garden Merit.

== Range ==
Known from the North Island of New Zealand.

== Habitat ==
Forests in mountainous regions.
