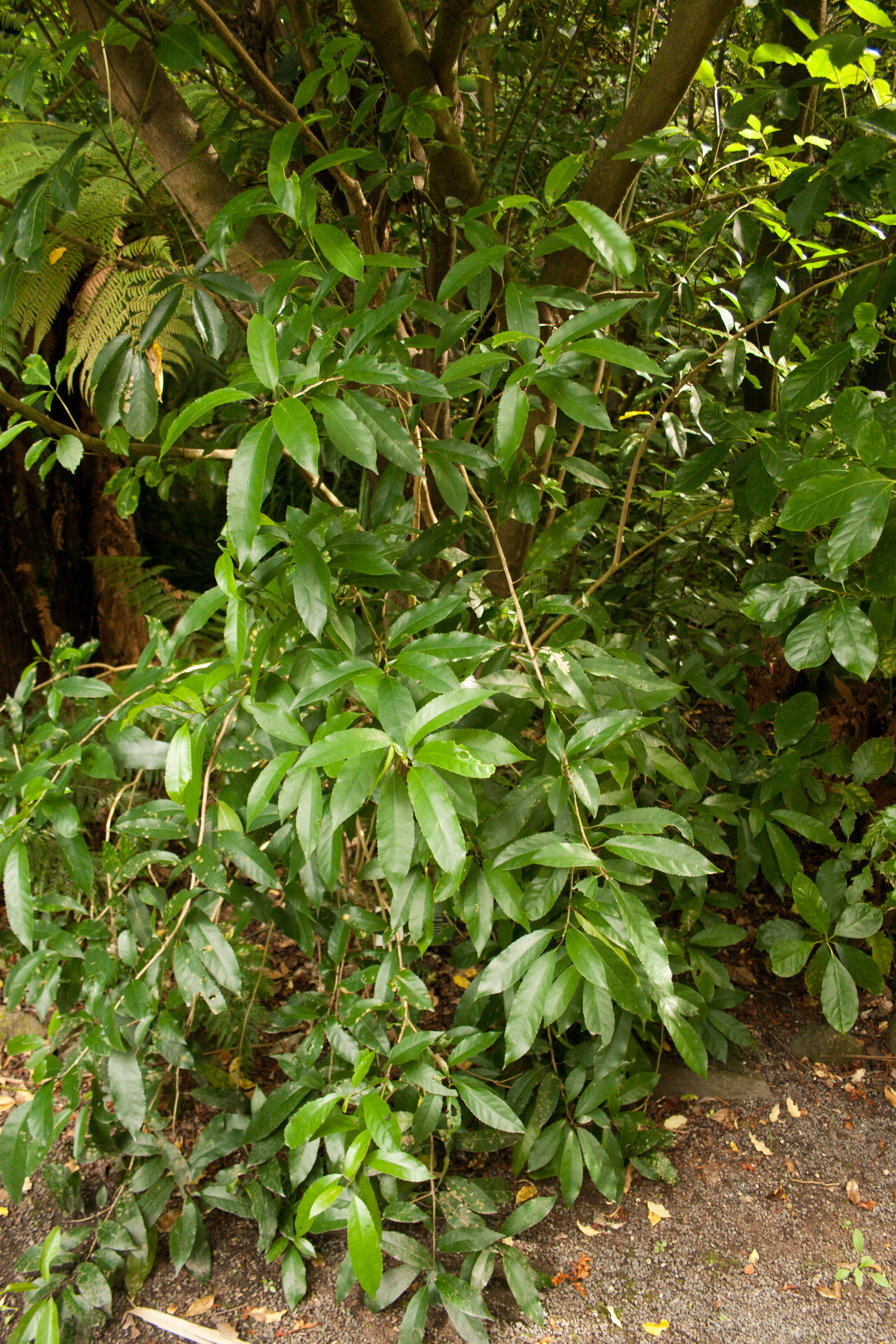
- Pseudopanax arboreus in Christchurch Botanical Gardens

Conservation status
- Least Concern (IUCN 3.1)

Scientific classification
- Kingdom: Plantae
- Clade: Embryophytes
- Clade: Tracheophytes
- Clade: Spermatophytes
- Clade: Angiosperms
- Clade: Eudicots
- Clade: Asterids
- Order: Apiales
- Family: Araliaceae
- Genus: Pseudopanax
- Species: P. arboreus

Binomial name
- Pseudopanax arboreus (L.f.) K.Koch (1859)

Synonyms
- Neopanax arboreus (Murray) Allan; Nothopanax arboreus (L.f.) Seem. (1866); Panax arboreus L.f. (1782); Panax australasius Pers. (1805), not validly publ.

= Pseudopanax arboreus =

Species of tree endemic to New Zealand

Pseudopanax arboreus, commonly known as five finger, five-finger or fivefinger (Māori: puahou or whauwhaupaku), is a New Zealand native tree belonging to the family Araliaceae. It is one of New Zealand's more common native trees, being found widely in bush, scrub and gardens throughout both islands. The compound leaves with five to seven leaflets, hence the name "five finger", are very characteristic of the tree and easily recognized.

Closely related and very similar to five finger are P. laetus, P. colensoi, and P. macintyrei.

== Description ==
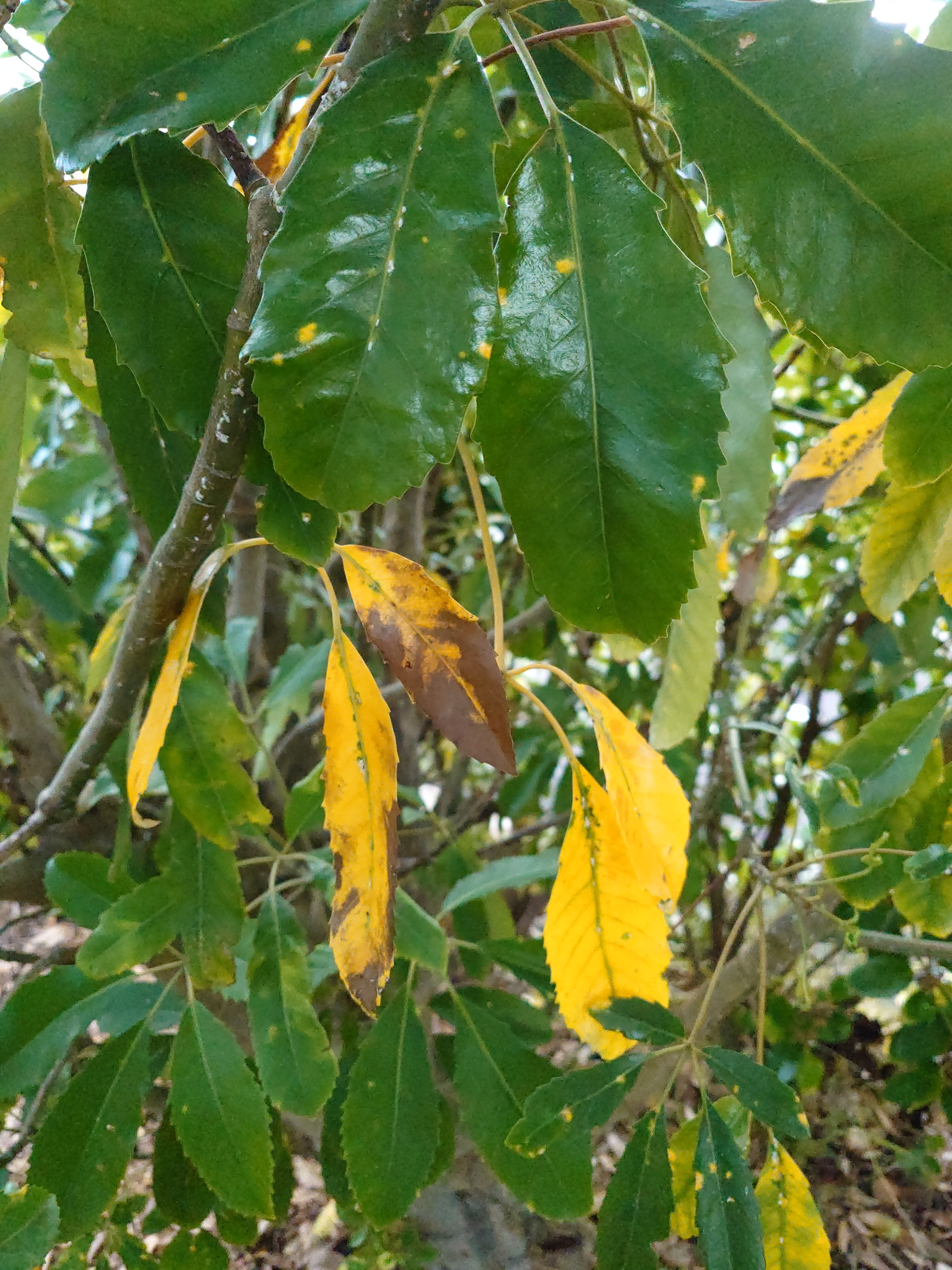
Foliage of P. aboreus

Leaflets obovate-oblong to oblong-cuneate, thinly coriaceous, coarsely serrate-dentate. Flowers usually unisexual; inflorescences are compound umbels with 8–20 primary branchlets up to 10 centimetres (3.9 inches) long, 15–20 secondary rays, umbellules with 10–15 flowers in each. Calyx truncate or obscurely 5-toothed; flowers 5mm in diameter, sweet-scented; petals 5, white to pink flushed, ovate to triangular, acute; stamens 5; ovary 2-loculed, each containing 1(-2) ovules; style branches 2, spreading. Fruit fleshy, very dark purple, laterally compressed, 5–8 mm diam.; style branches retained on an apical disc. Seeds 2(-3) per fruit, wrinkled, 3–6 mm long.

== Ecology ==
Pseudopanax arboreus is a host species for the caterpillar of the endemic North Island moth Declana atronivea. Pseudopanax arboreus is ranked one of New Zealand's least flammable tree species.
