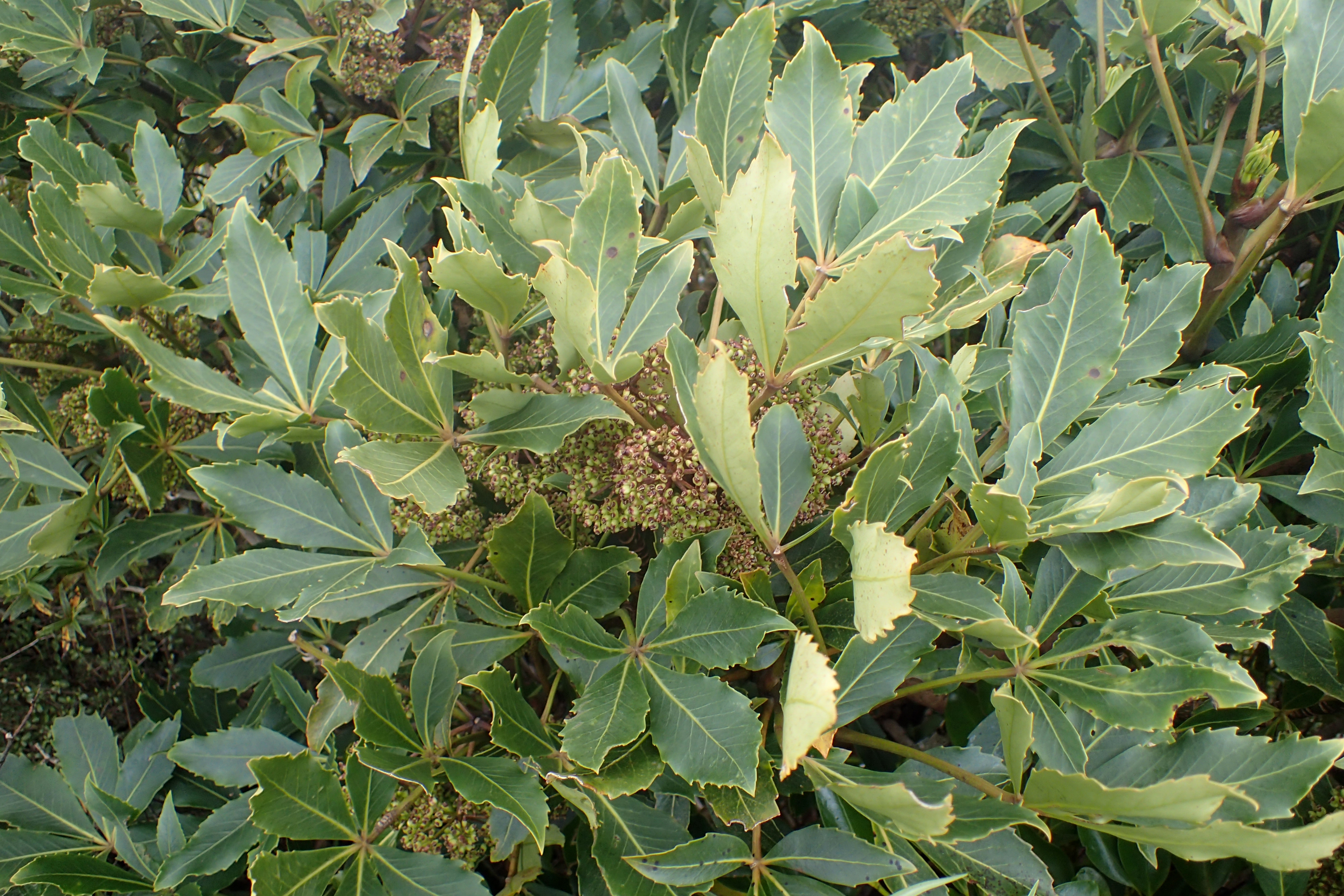

Conservation status
- Least Concern (IUCN 3.1)

Scientific classification
- Kingdom: Plantae
- Clade: Tracheophytes
- Clade: Angiosperms
- Clade: Eudicots
- Clade: Asterids
- Order: Apiales
- Family: Araliaceae
- Genus: Neopanax
- Species: N. colensoi

Binomial name
- Neopanax colensoi (Hook.f.) Philipson (1965)

Synonyms
- Nothopanax colensoi (Hook.f.) Seem. (1866); Neopanax colensoi (Hook.f.) Allan (1961); Neopanax colensoi var. montanus Allan (1961); Panax colensoi Hook.f. (1852); Panax colensoi var. montanus Kirk (1899); Pseudopanax colensoi var. fiordensis Wardle (1968); Pseudopanax colensoi var. ternatus Wardle (1968)

= Pseudopanax colensoi =

Species of flowering plant

Pseudopanax colensoi, commonly known as the mountain fivefinger in English and orihou in Māori, is an endemic species to New Zealand. It is a shrub that can often grow into a small canopy tree, and is found in high altitude environments in its preferred areas around New Zealand. It is a member of the Neopanax clade, and is referred to by some sources as Neopanax colensoi.

== Description ==
Pseudopanax colensoi is a shrub that can often grow into a small canopy tree that has big glossy yellowish green leaves with purplish stalks. Each leaflet measures 12–25 cm long and around 5–10 cm wide or more. Each leaf has five to seven leaflets. The leaves are toothed/serrated along their edges. With large spreading branches and compound petiole leaves, Pseudopanax colensoi can grow up to around 8 meters tall. The growth form of a Pseudopanax colensoi is a shrub and can often grow into small canopy trees, other species of Neopanax can be shrubs used in some landscaping. Some people prune the roots of the plants but to prune the roots of a Pseudopanax colensoi would dramatically affect how much they grow. A cluster of whiteish-green flowers grow in clusters of 10–15 that look like little umbrellas. The clusters grow into bigger clusters on the purplish stalks of the plant as they grow. The flowers then produce fruit that is either all male or all females. Female fruit is much darker in colour and less than 1 cm in diameter.

Pseudopanax colensoi is commonly known as the mountain fivefinger because it looks like a hand since it has five leaves. The middle leaf of the Pseudopanax colensoi is the longest, resembling an index finger, and the leaves get smaller from there resembling the thumb and pinky finger on the human hand.

== Range ==
=== Natural global range ===
Pseudopanax colensoi is endemic to New Zealand. Between the years 2004–2017, Pseudopanax colensoi has not been a threatened species. There are currently three subspecific taxa in New Zealand for Pseudopanax colensoi. Pseudopanax colensoi naturally occurs around New Zealand. Throughout the Nelson and Marlborough regions the Pseudopanax colensoi occurs from sea level up to over 1,200 m above sea level. It is a common species that does extremely well in New Zealand's various climates.

=== New Zealand range ===
Pseudopanax colensoi is a common species in New Zealand and is found all over the country but more commonly in some specific areas. There are Pseudopanax colensoi populations located throughout New Zealand, particularly in and around the Otago, Dunedin area on the east coast of the South Island and south of Banks Peninsula in Canterbury. It is occasionally found in the North Island along the Coromandel Range. Pseudopanax colensoi var. colensoi is seemingly absent from the West Coast of the South Island.

== Habitat ==
Pseudopanax colensoi has certain preferred habitats. Pseudopanax colensoi var. colensoi is found in mountainous areas between 300 and 800 meters above sea level and low alpine forests and scrubland, while other varieties like ternatus can grown at higher elevations. When one species is taken away from a populated area of Pseudopanax colensoi it is quickly replaced with most commonly another from the same family. Pseudopanax colensoi likes to live in areas that are away from water but in an area with nutrient rich soils. Different species of Neopanax do well in different habitats. Some do well in poor soil conditions, dry shaded areas, with a divaricating habitat. Others are used in gardens as decorative plants taking up little room. Some Neopanax do well in nurseries for vegetation cover.

== Ecology ==
=== Life cycle and phenology ===
The most common form of plant dispersal is through either wind, water, or animals. Different plants disperse their seeds further away from it or drop their seeds onto an animal so it can move around and give the seeds a better survival chance. For Pseudopanax colensoi the phenology of germination for the seed is very important. The seed needs the soil to be at a cold temperature and a little bit damp for 1–3 months which gives the seed a better germination rate which occurs within those 1–3 months. Pseudopanax colensoi seeds take around 6 months to germinate because it needs the correct temperatures. Most species of Neopanax have their fruit ripen between January and April in the summer to autumn months. The seeds of Pseudopanax colensoi do not have good storage capacity. The Pseudopanax colensoi flowers and fruits between October and March. Neopanax colensoi produce flowers that are a creamy greenish colour. When the fruit is ripe, it turns a dark purple colour, and there are only two seeds per fruit. The average life span of a Neopanax species is around 15–20 years.

=== Diet and foraging ===
Pseudopanax colensoi and other Neopanax species can handle a wide range of different soil types but it most commonly likes and gets planted in soils that have poor structure. This is because they help with erosion control in areas that have poorly structured soil. Different species like a different amount of water; some Neopanax species like dry soils and others tolerate wet soils. Pseudopanax colensoi doesn't mind either wet soils or dry soils as long as the environmental conditions are right. Pseudopanax colensoi seedlings need certain soil mixes to germinate, which can be either potting mixes, pricking out mixes, rooting mixes, seed sowing mixes and soil. Adding materials such as bark, peat, sawdust, perlite, pumice, vermiculite, sand, and grit to the soil can provide nutrients and improve the chances of survival in a Pseudopanax colensoi plant.

=== Predators, parasites, and diseases ===
Pseudopanax colensoi is a fast-growing native plant that attracts a wide range of different birds which eat its fruit during October and March. There are many diseases, parasites and predators that can harm any native species and have many devastating impacts. Some examples of different fungi that affect Pseudopanax colensoi are phytophthora, pythium, grey mould, root rot and rhizoctonia. Pseudopanax colensoi seedlings and mature trees are highly vulnerable to the damaging effects of various types of fungi. Unfortunately, once these fungi have infected the Pseudopanax colensoi, it can be difficult to salvage the plant and get it back to a healthy state. In this case, the only option is to remove the entire plant to prevent the fungi from spreading and causing further harm to other species around it. Leaf spots on young Pseudopanax colensoi seedlings can be a significant issue in certain regions around New Zealand, infecting the leaves and harming seedlings and fully grown plants. Possums, aphids, mice, slugs, snails, woodlice, caterpillars, and grubs are some pests that can cause harm to Pseudopanax colensoi. Possums pose a significant threat to native plants due to their destructive nature and potential to spread diseases. Their destructive nature causes them to tear up Pseudopanax colensoi trees and can cause serious harm to Pseudopanax colensoi when it comes to growth and the overall health of the Pseudopanax colensoi plant. Pseudopanax colensoi have a common predator like many other plants, the red deer (Cervus elaphus) . Deer particularly sought after different varieties of Pseudopanax colensoi . Deer strip all the bark off Pseudopanax colensoi, affecting its strength and causing it to become brittle and break. Most Pseudopanax colensoi become leafless and die but those over 40 cm (16 in) often remain untouched by red deer. Pseudopanax colensoi lives in areas that vary depending on rainfall, sunlight, oceanic climate, wind, and snow. In these varied climates, there is a huge range of predators that can affect Pseudopanax colensoi. In different areas some predators that would disturb Pseudopanax colensoi would be common predators such as possums, rats, wasps, wild goats, hedgehogs, and ants (Animal pests and threats A-Z). These pests cause great disturbance to the Pseudopanax colensoi and the ecosystems that they live in.
