= Cauliflory =

Botanical term referring to plants that flower from their main stems

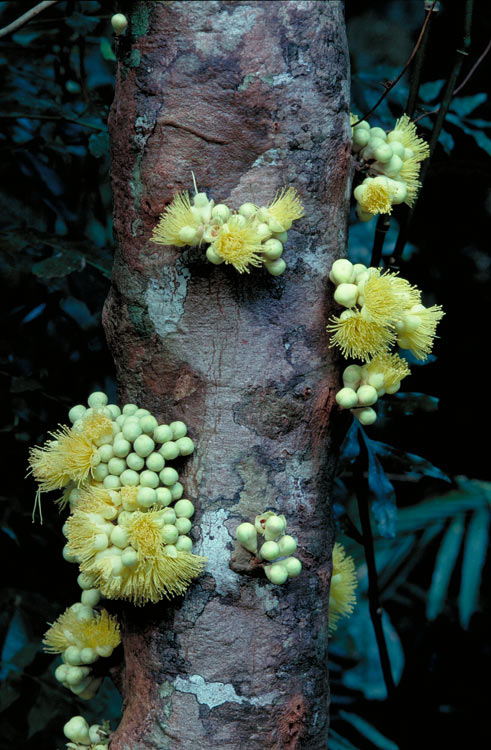
Flowers of Syzygium monospermum

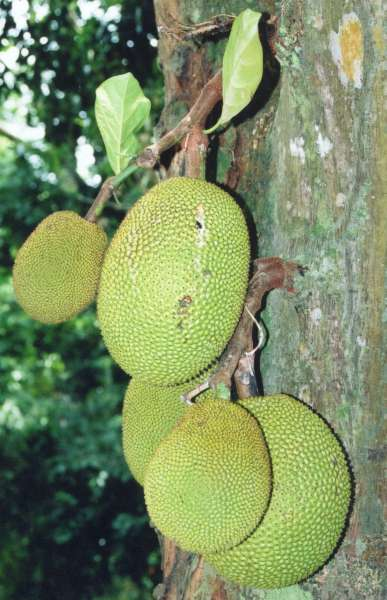
Jackfruits

Cauliflory is a botanical term referring to plants that flower and fruit from their main stems or woody trunks, rather than from new growth and shoots. It is rare in temperate regions but common in tropical forests.

There have been several strategies to distinguish among types of cauliflory historically, including the location or age of branch where inflorescences grow, whether inflorescences attach to stolons or branches, and whether axillary nodes or adventitious nodes develop into reproductive tissues. Cauliflory is a non-homologous phenomenon with several different sources of development and evolutionary value.

The development of buds in axillary cauliflorous species occurs through either the re-use of the same position or old tissue over seasons of growth or release from dormancy. In both cases, vascularization of the bud must occur from pre-existing tissue, such as the pith. In Cercis canadensis, dormant buds break annually in a sympodial pattern. If flowers develop adventitiously, they form similarly to epicormic tissues and may be reactive to immediate environmental conditions. In certain species of Ficus, flowers may be produced from axillary buds in young plants and change to adventitious buds later.

One frequently suggested hypothesis for the evolution of cauliflory is to allow trees to be pollinated or have their seeds dispersed by animals, especially bats, that climb on trunks and sturdy limbs to feed on the nectar and fruits. Some species may instead have fruit which drops from the canopy and ripen only after they reach the ground, an alternative strategy termed nonfunctionally caulicarpic fruits. In Ficus, there is not an association between the evolution of cauliflory as an apomorphy and ecological associations. Alternative hypotheses have focused on competition for sugar and minerals between flowers and young leaves, mechanical support for larger flowers and fruits particularly in Artocarpus and Durio, and evolutionary theory built on the plant as a metapopulation and differential rates of mutations across large plant bodies.

An extreme version is flagelliflory where long, whip-like branches descend from the main trunk and bear all the inflorescences. The branches grow to and along the ground and even below it. As a result, the plant or tree's flowers can appear to emerge from the soil. Examples are known mostly from the plant families Annonaceae and Moraceae such as a species of Desmopsisterriflora but also include Couroupita guianensis (Lecythidaceae) and the cactus Weberocereus tunilla (Cactaceae).

== Cauliflorous species ==
List of some species of cauliflorous plants with articles (list may be incomplete):

- Annonaceae
  - Uvariopsis (all species are ramiflorous, cauliflorous or both.) Cauliflorous species are: U. submontana. U. congolana, U. guineensis, U. vanderystii,
  - Piptostigma
  - Annonidium mannii
- Aristolochiaceae
  - Aristolochia arborea
- Bignoniaceae
  - Adenocalymma
  - Amphitecna, Parmentiera, Crescentia
  - Rhodocolea, Colea
- Caricaceae
  - Carica papaya (papaya)
- Cunoniaceae
  - Davidsonia
- Ebenaceae
  - Diospyros
- Fabaceae
  - Cercis siliquastrum
  - Castanospermum australe
  - Cynometra cauliflora
- Lecythidaceae
  - Couroupita guianensis (cannonball tree)
  - Grias
- Malvaceae
  - Theobroma cacao (cacao), T. grandiflorum (cupuaçu) (and possibly others)
  - Cola mossambicensis
  - Crescentia cujete (calabash tree).
  - Pavonia strictiflora
  - Durian
- Meliaceae
  - Didymocheton spectabilis (kohekohe)
  - Epicharis parasitica
- Moraceae
  - Ficus racemosa (cluster fig), F. sansibarica (knobby fig), F. sur (Cape fig), F. sycomorus (sycamore fig), F. coronata (sandpaper fig)
  - Artocarpus heterophyllus (jackfruit), A. integer (chempedak), A. altilis (breadfruit)
- Myrtaceae
  - Syzygium branderhorstii, S. cormiflorum, S.erythrocalyx, S. moorei
  - Plinia cauliflora
- Onagraceae
  - Fuchsia excorticata (kōtukutuku)
- Oxalidaceae
  - Averrhoa bilimbi (bilimbi)
- Sapindaceae
  - Chytranthus
  - Pancovia:
- Sapotaceae
  - Englerophytum magalismontanum (stamvrug)
  - Omphalocarpum
- Stilbaceae
  - Halleria lucida (tree fuchsia)
- Surianaceae
  - Recchia simplicifolia
- Thymelaeaceae
  - Phaleria clerodendron (scented daphne)

== Image gallery ==
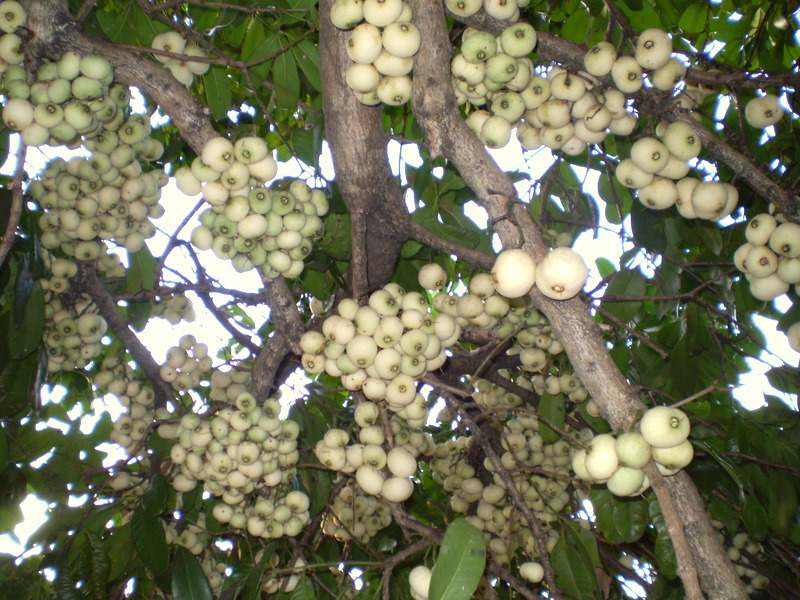
Syzygium moorei fruit

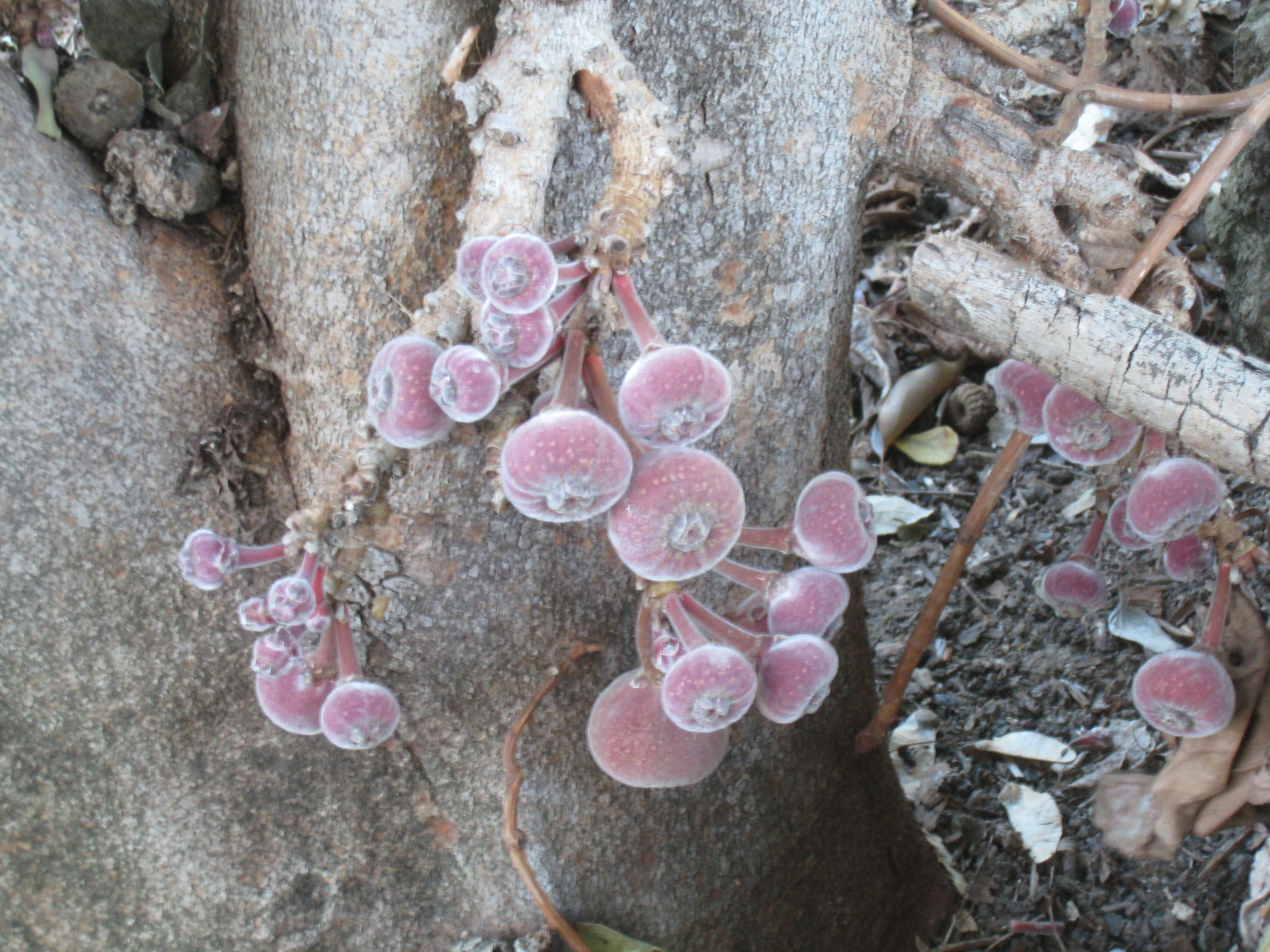
Ficus (fig)

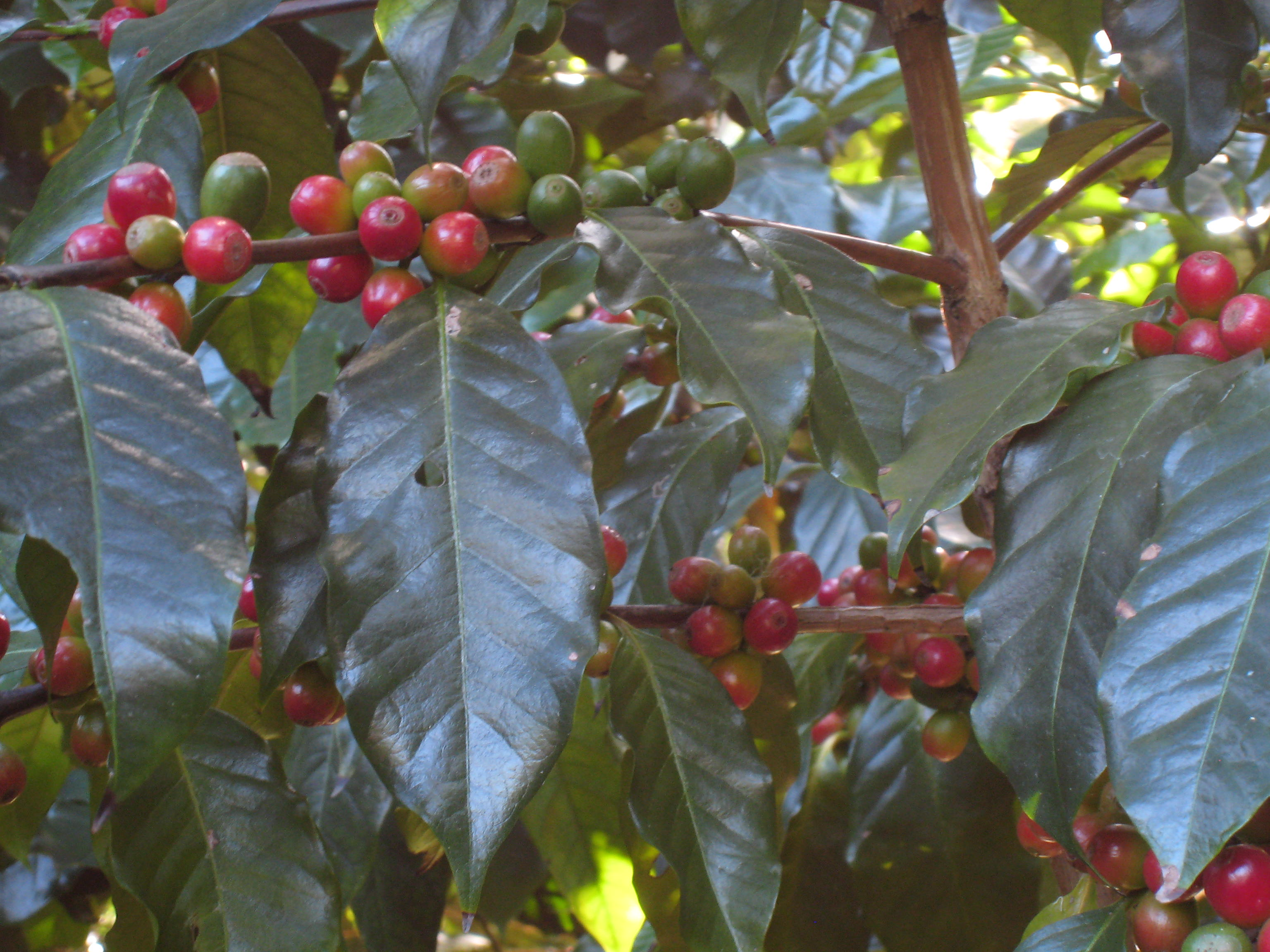
Coffee Plant (Coffea)

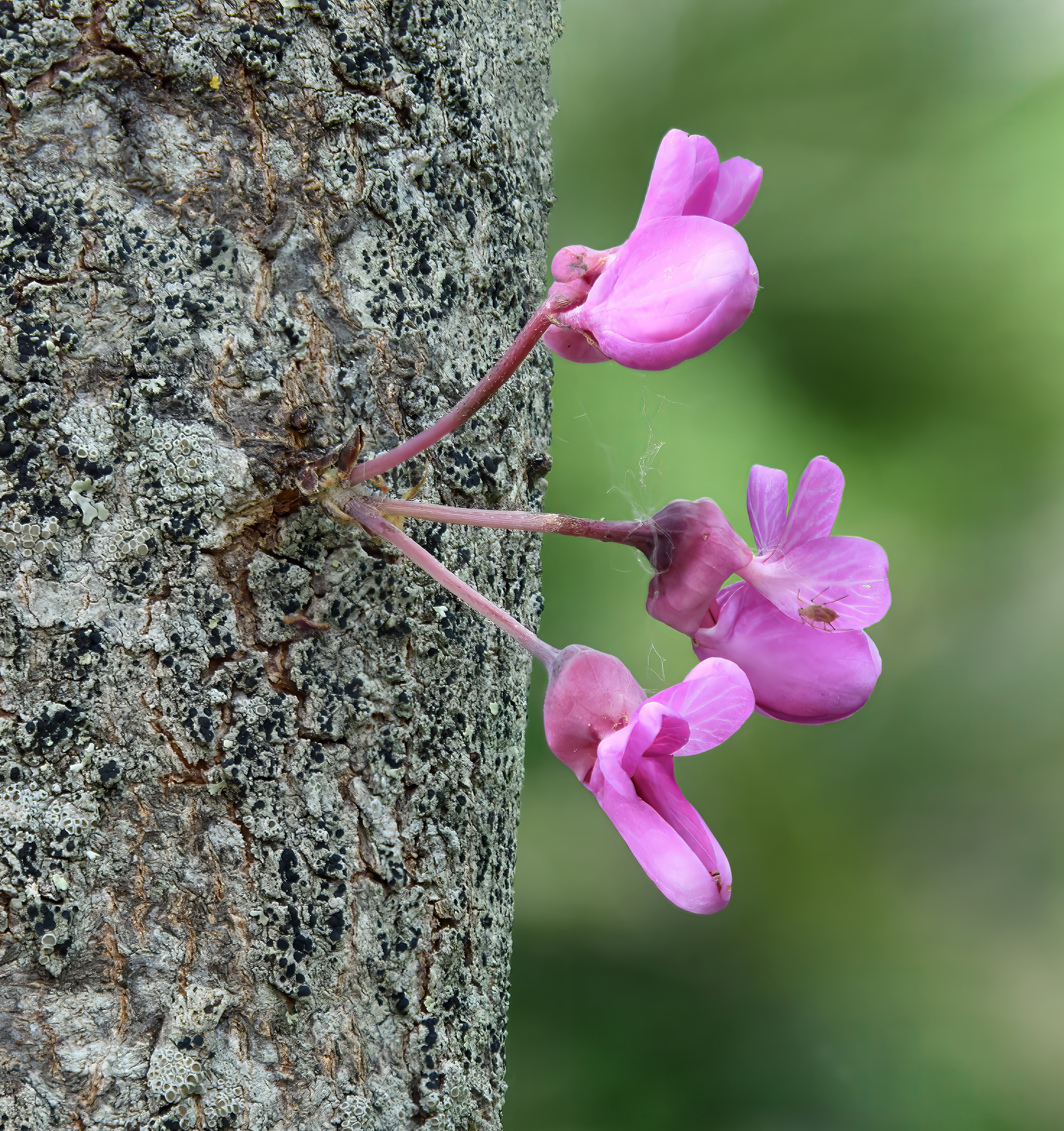
Cercis siliquastrum

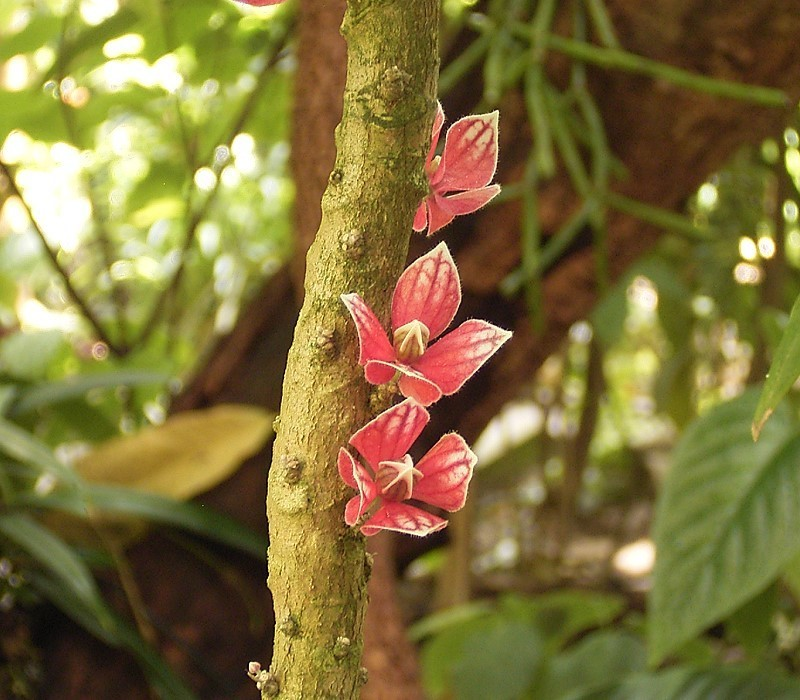
Pavonia strictiflora

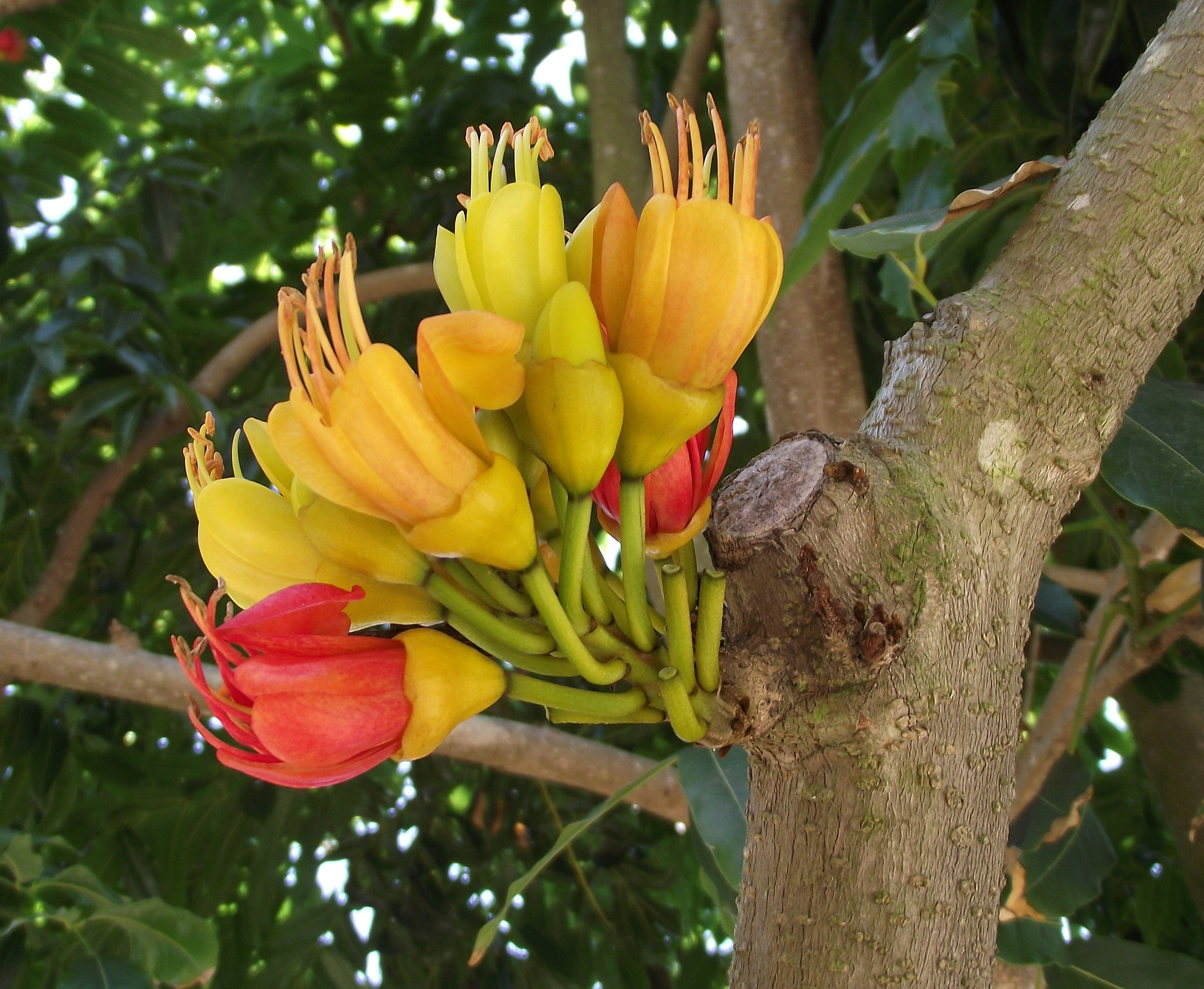
Castanospermum australe

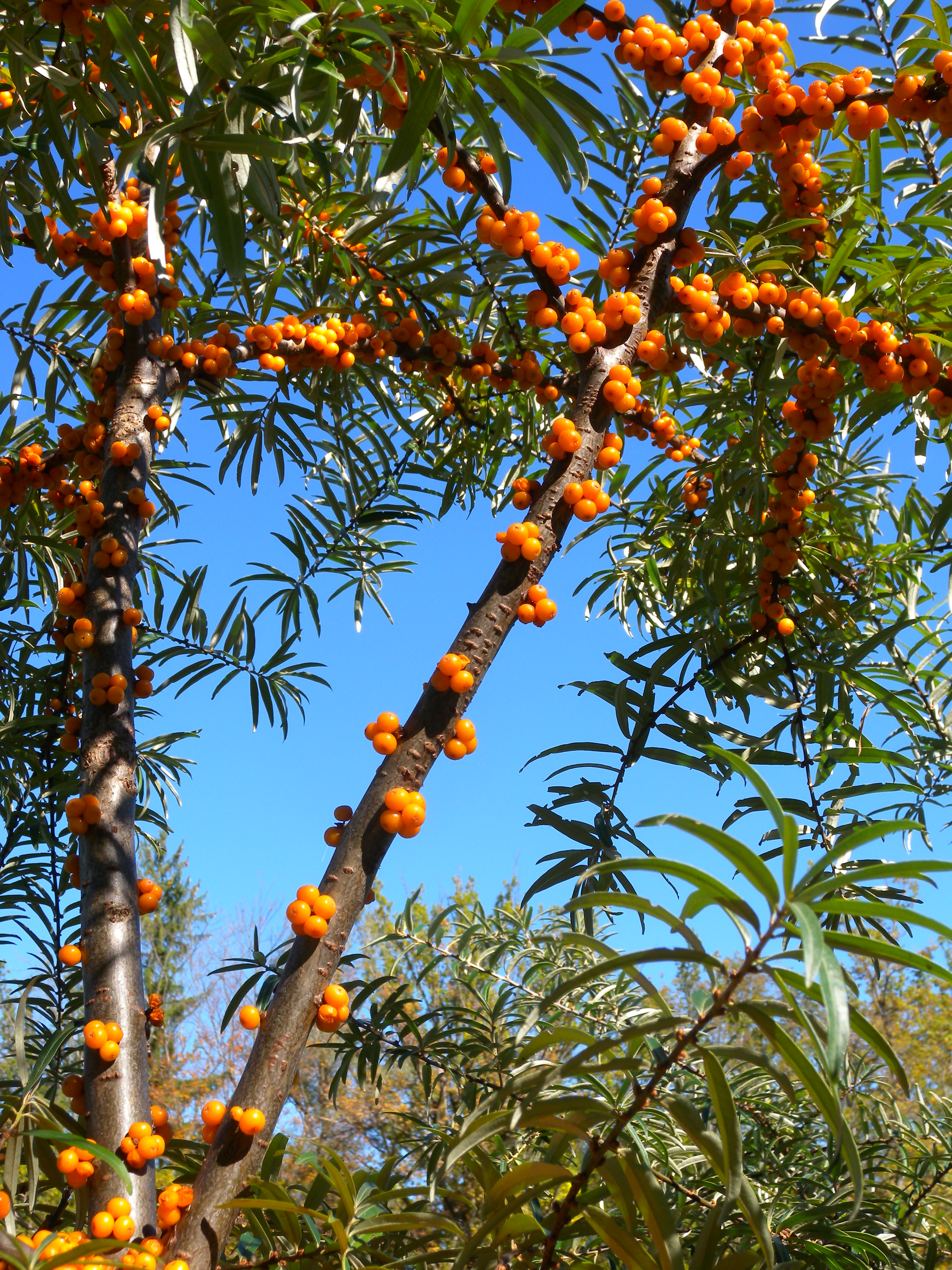
Hippophaë rhamnoides

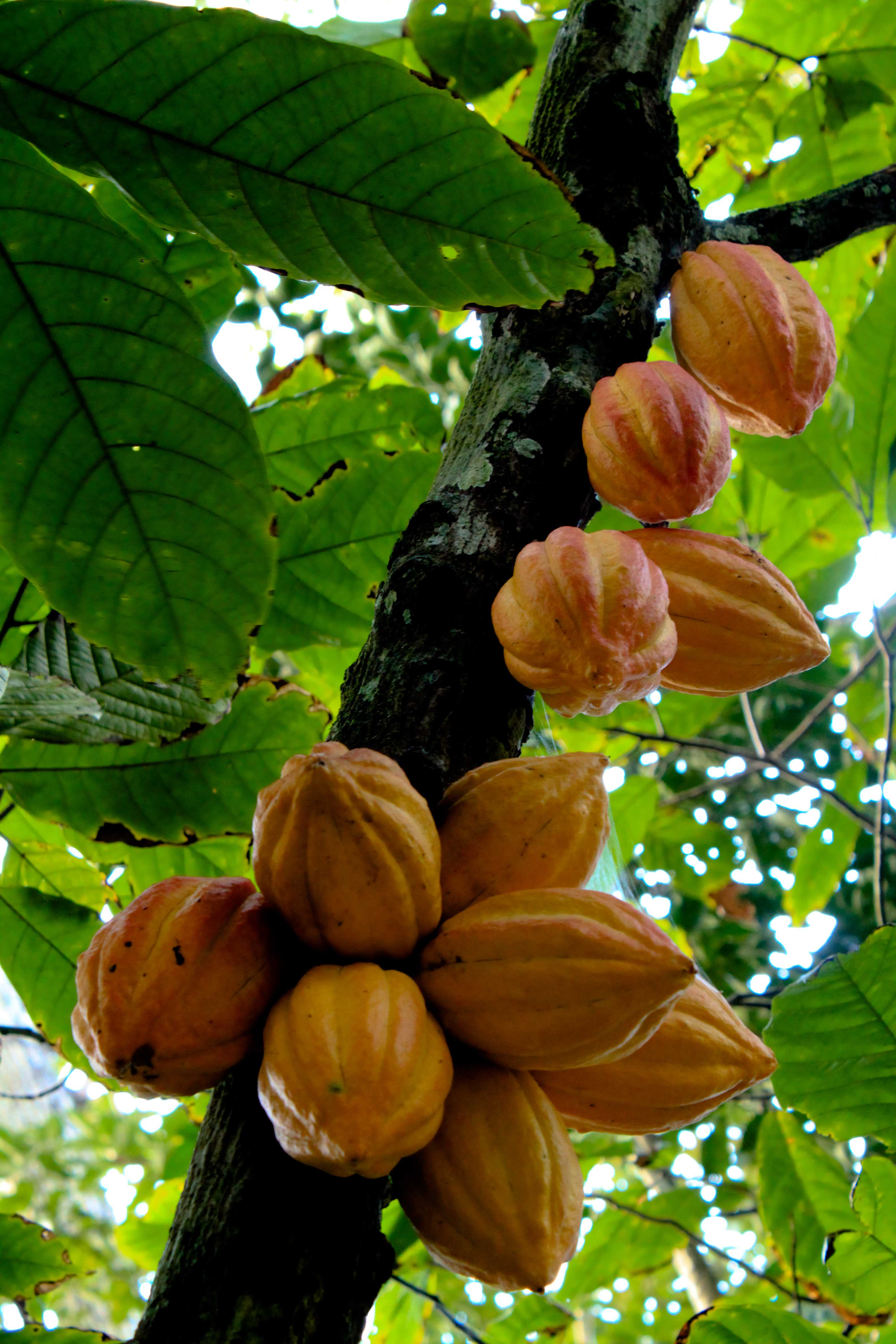
Theobroma cacao

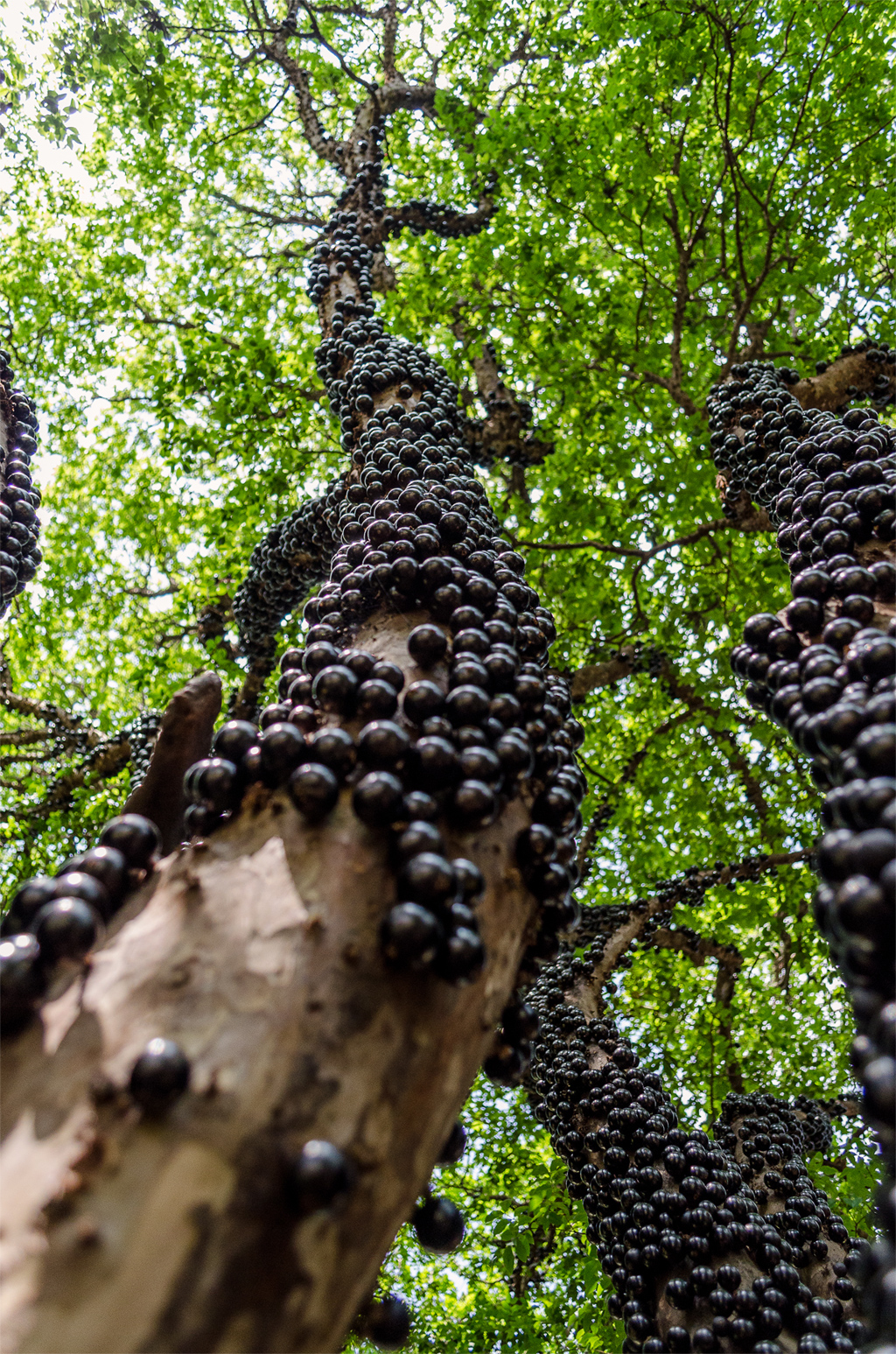
Jabuticaba (Plinia cauliflora)

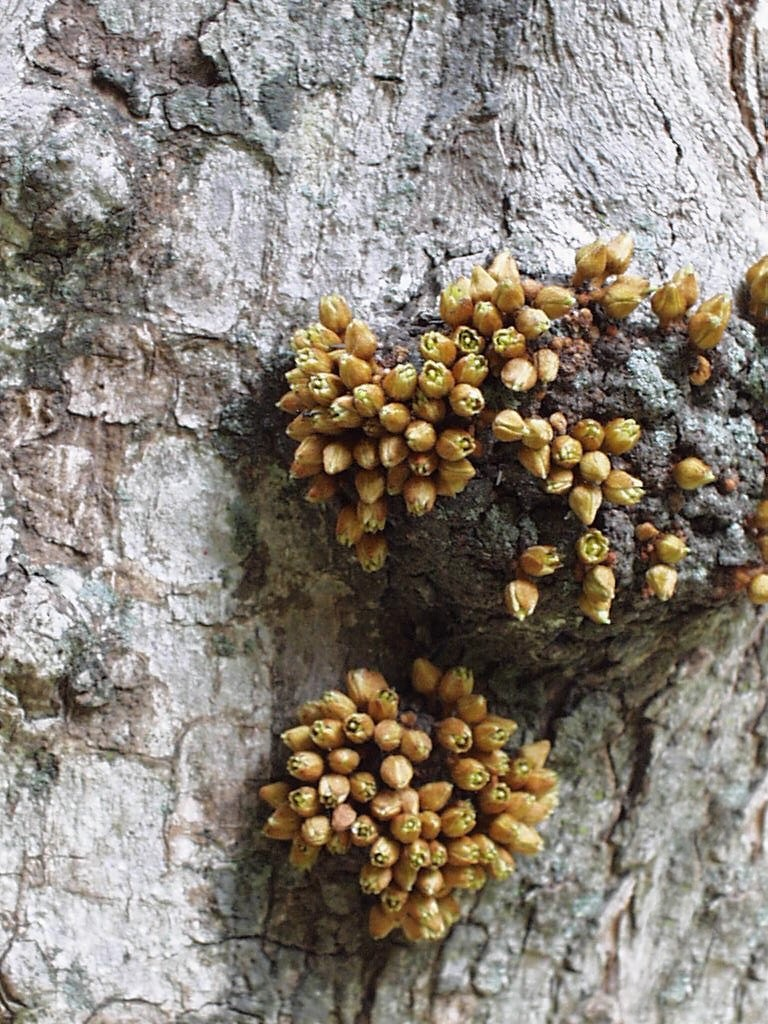
Englerophytum magalismontanum

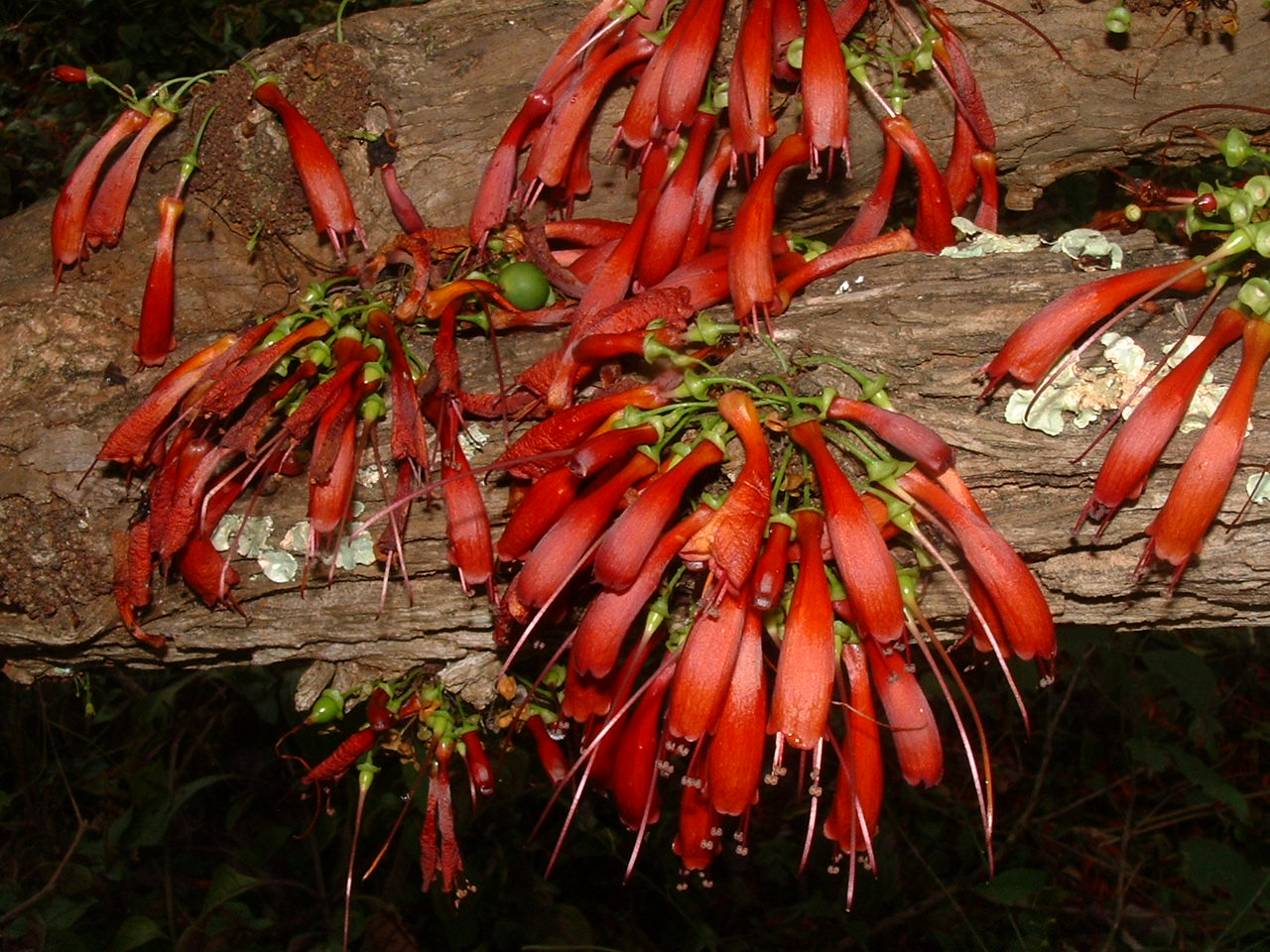
Halleria lucida

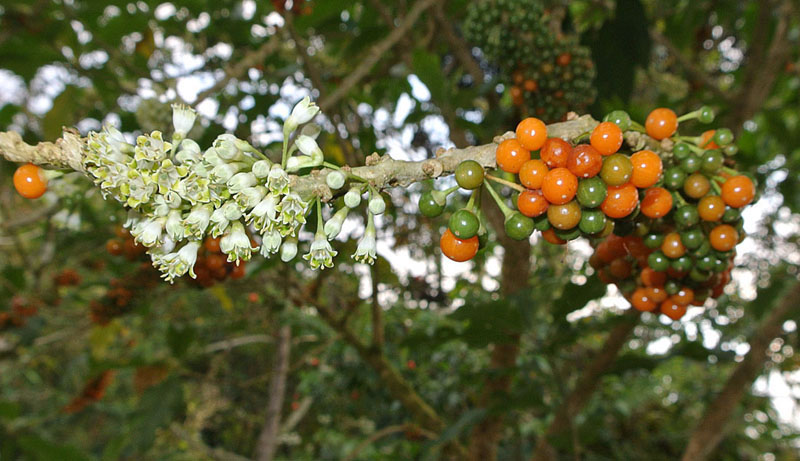
Iochroma arborescens

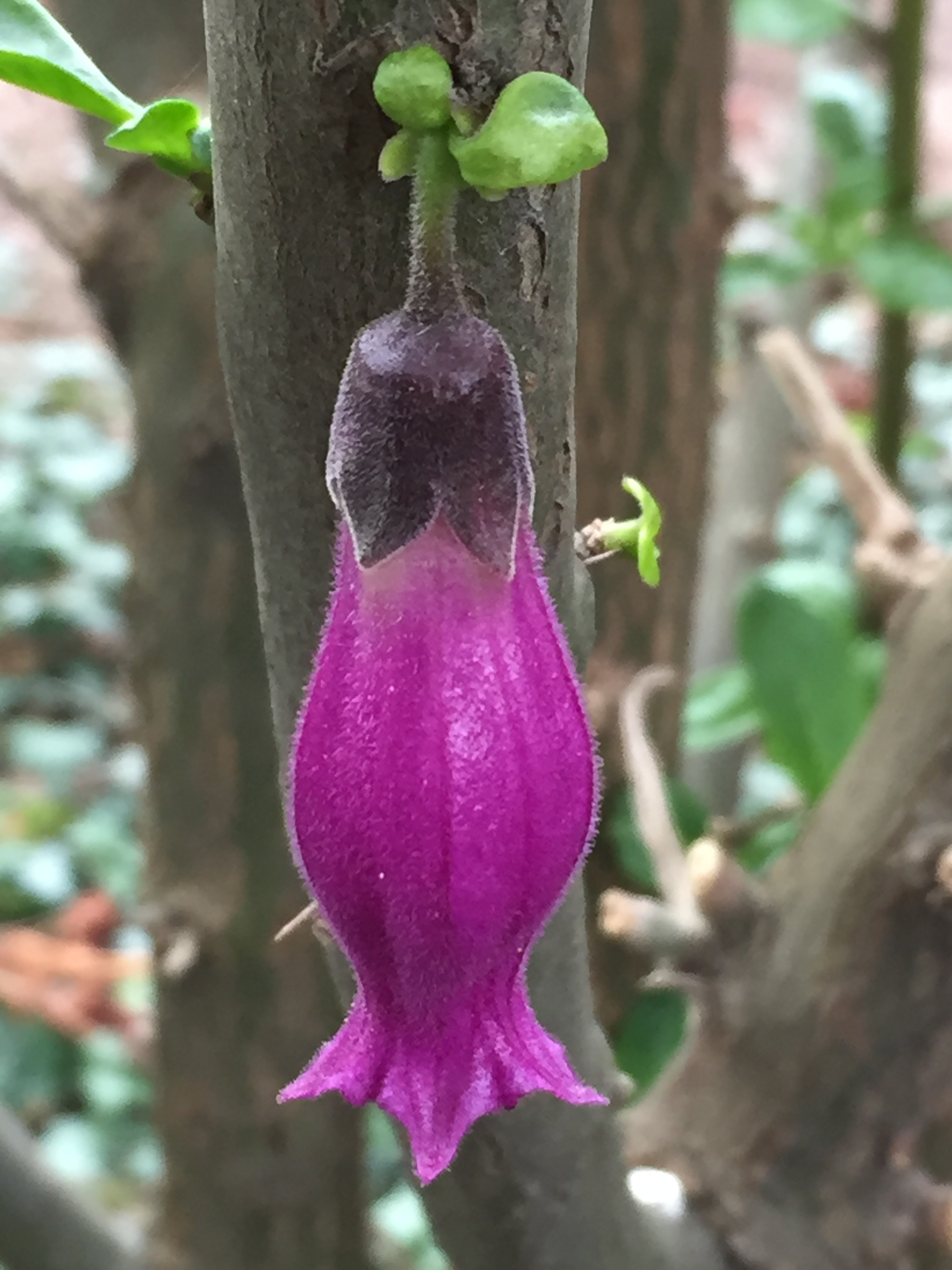
Latua pubiflora

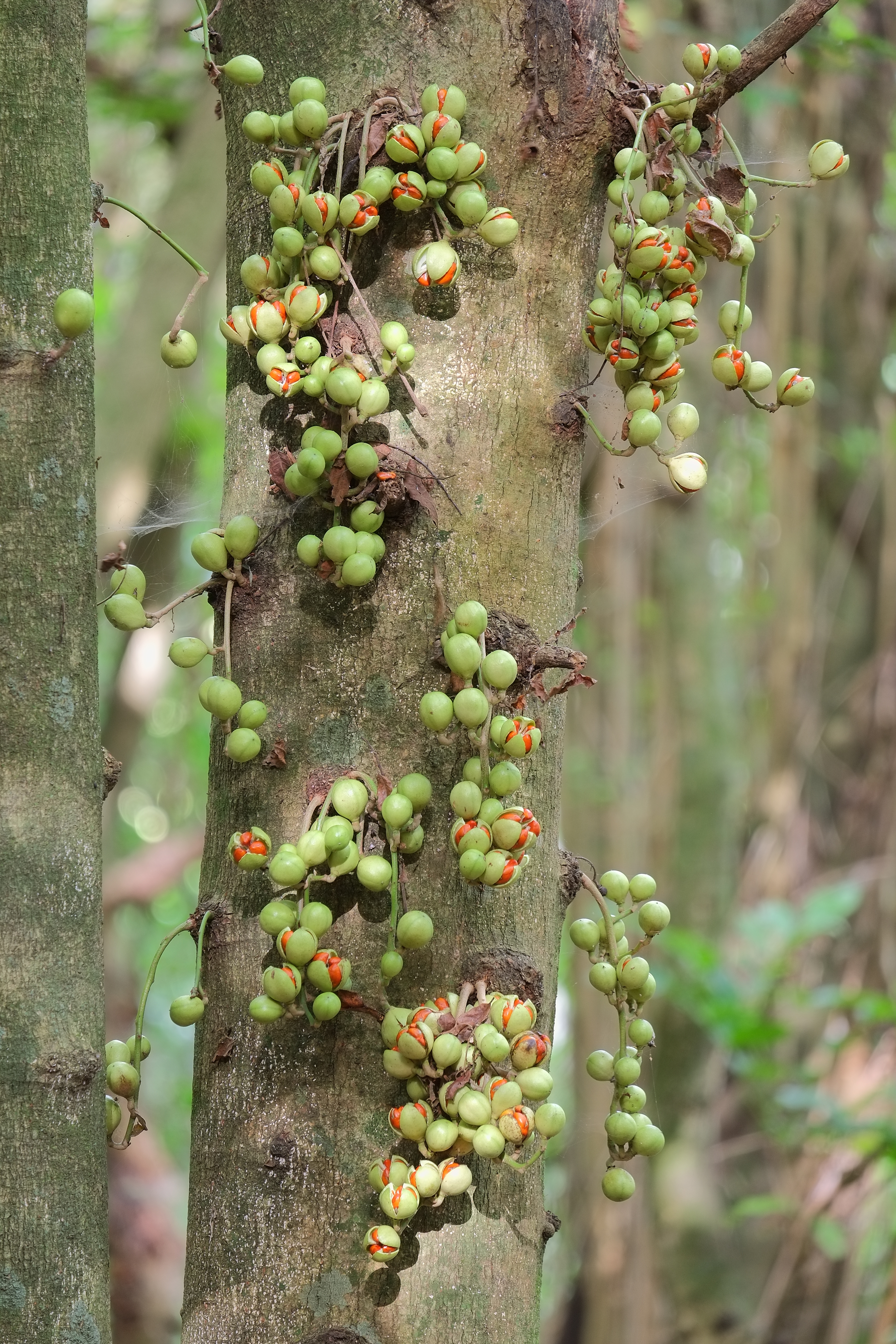
Kohekohe (Dysoxylum spectabile)

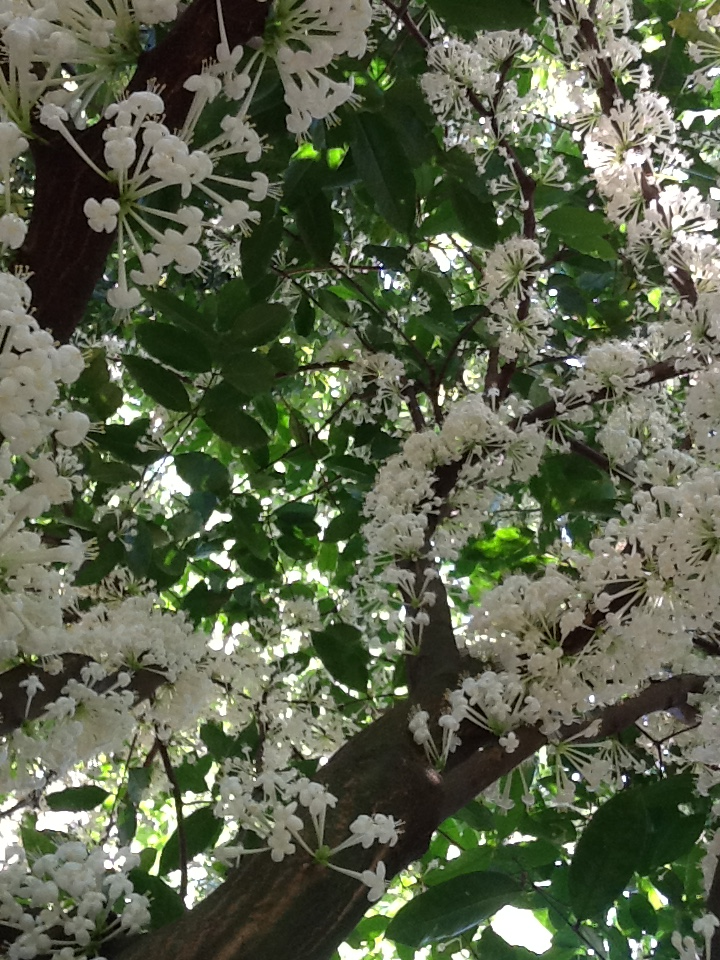
Scented daphne Phaleria clerodendron

== See also ==
- Ramiflory
- Spur
- Adventitious buds
