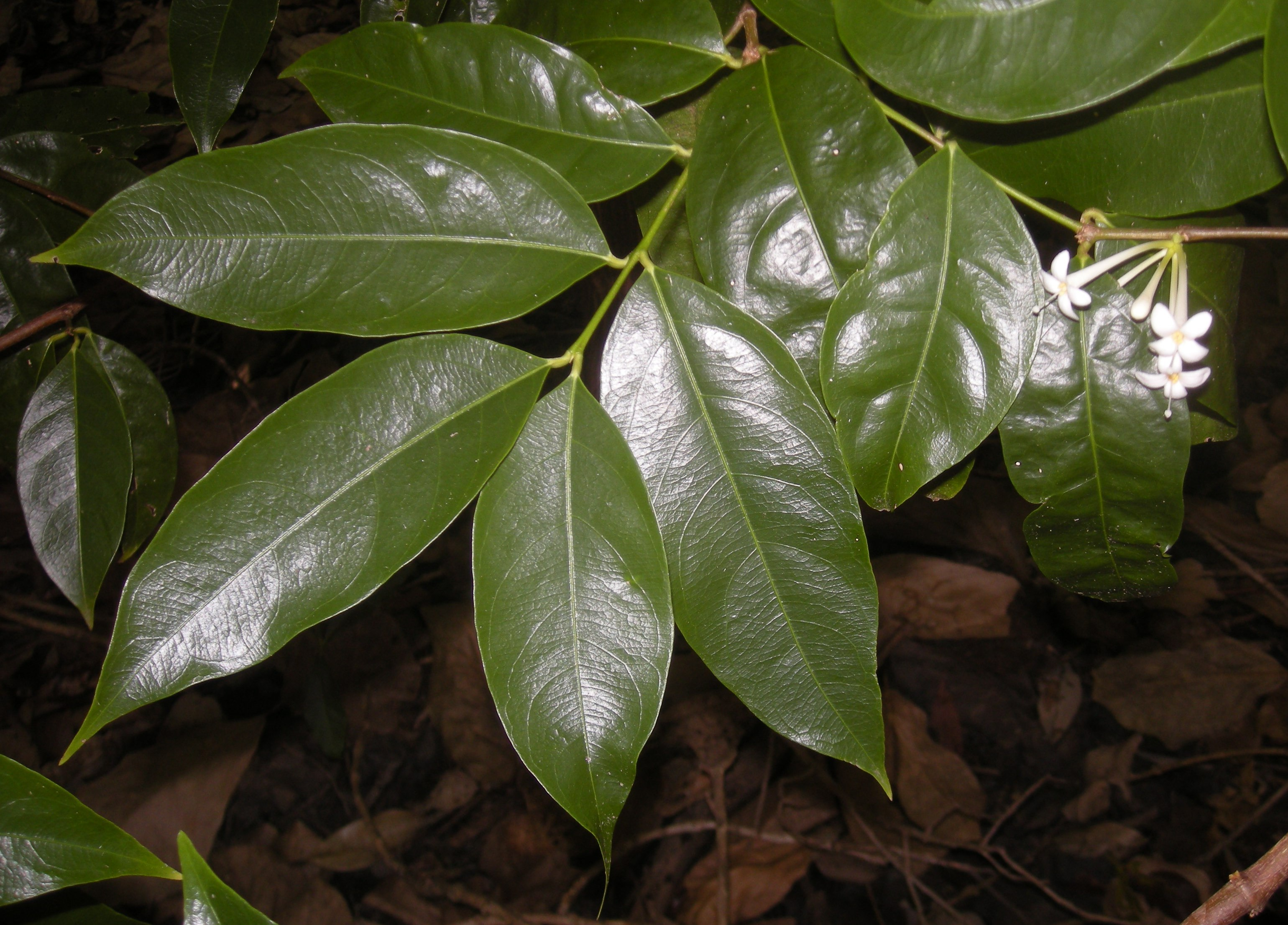

Conservation status
- Least Concern (NCA)

Scientific classification
- Kingdom: Plantae
- Clade: Tracheophytes
- Clade: Angiosperms
- Clade: Eudicots
- Clade: Rosids
- Order: Malvales
- Family: Thymelaeaceae
- Genus: Phaleria
- Species: P. clerodendron

Binomial name
- Phaleria clerodendron (F.Muell.) Benth.

Synonyms
- Drimyspermum clerodendron F.Muell.

= Phaleria clerodendron =

Scented daphne

Species of plant endemic to Queensland, Australia

Phaleria clerodendron, commonly known as scented daphne, scented phaleria or rosy apple, is an evergreen tree or tall shrub in the family Thymelaeaceae. It is endemic to the rainforests of north-eastern Queensland, Australia.

== Description ==
The scented daphne grows as a large shrub or small tree, usually around 3.5 m (11 ft) in height but may be up to 10 m (33 ft). It is often multi-stemmed and may be buttressed. The glabrous (hairless) dark green leaves are simple, measure up to 20 cm (8 in) long by 7.5 cm (3 in) wide, and are attached to the twig with a petiole around 1 cm (0.4 in) long.

Flowering occurs from October to April and the inflorescences mostly arise from the branches (ramiflorous), or from the trunk (cauliflorous), but may also arise in the leaf axils. The fragrant, clustered, white flowers have a very long corolla tube up to 40 mm (1.6 in) long, much longer than the petals. They are followed by globose, fleshy, red fruits which are drupes, and they ripen between December and July.

== Taxonomy ==
Ferdinand von Mueller initially described the species in 1869 as Drimyspermum clerodendron in his work Fragmenta Phytographiae Australiae (vol.7), from material collected by John Dallachy at Rockingham Bay. In 1873 George Bentham published another description in Flora Australiensis (vol.6), in which it was given the current binomial combination.

=== Etymology ===
The genus name Phaleria comes from the Ancient Greek phálāros meaning "having a white spot"; the species epithet clerodendron refers to the plant's resemblance to the genus Clerodendrum.

== Distribution and habitat ==
P. clerodendron is endemic to north-eastern Queensland, with recorded occurrences from near Cooktown in the north to Cardwell in the south. It grows in well developed rainforest at altitudes ranging from sea level up to about 900 m (3,000 ft), thus it is found in almost all parts of, and entirely contained within, the Wet Tropics of Queensland World Heritage Area, with the exception of the highest peaks and the most southern section.

== Ecology ==
Fruits of the scented daphne are eaten by cassowaries.

== Conservation ==
This species is listed by the Queensland Department of Environment and Science as least concern. As of 3 July 2021, it has not been assessed by the IUCN.

== Cultivation ==
The species is regarded as an attractive garden ornamental due to its dark green foliage, the spectacular and pleasantly-scented flower clusters, and the colourful fruit. It may be grown with the correct care as far south as Sydney.

== Gallery ==
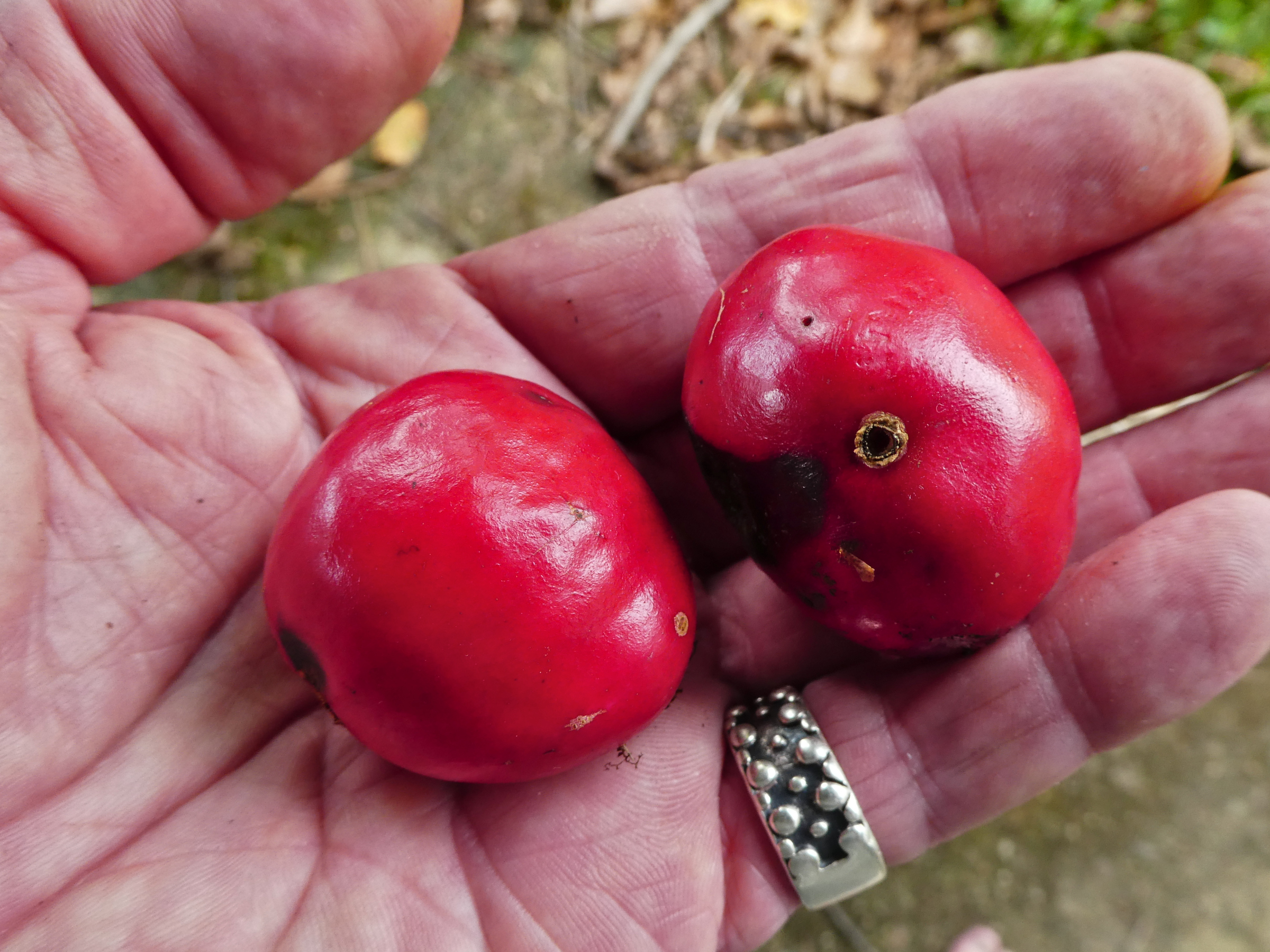
Ripe fruits, Cairns Botanic Gardens, July 2021

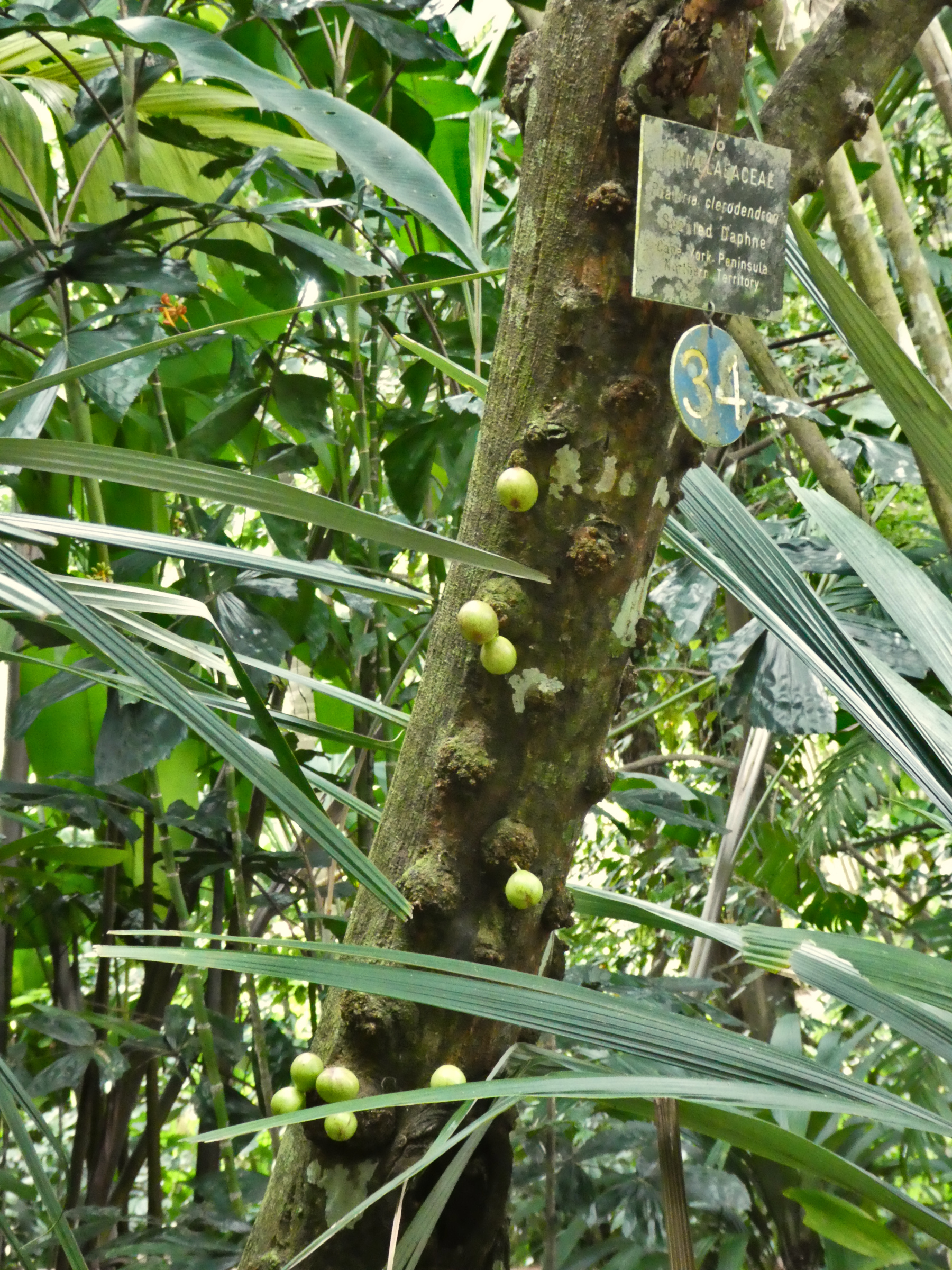
Trunk with unripened fruit

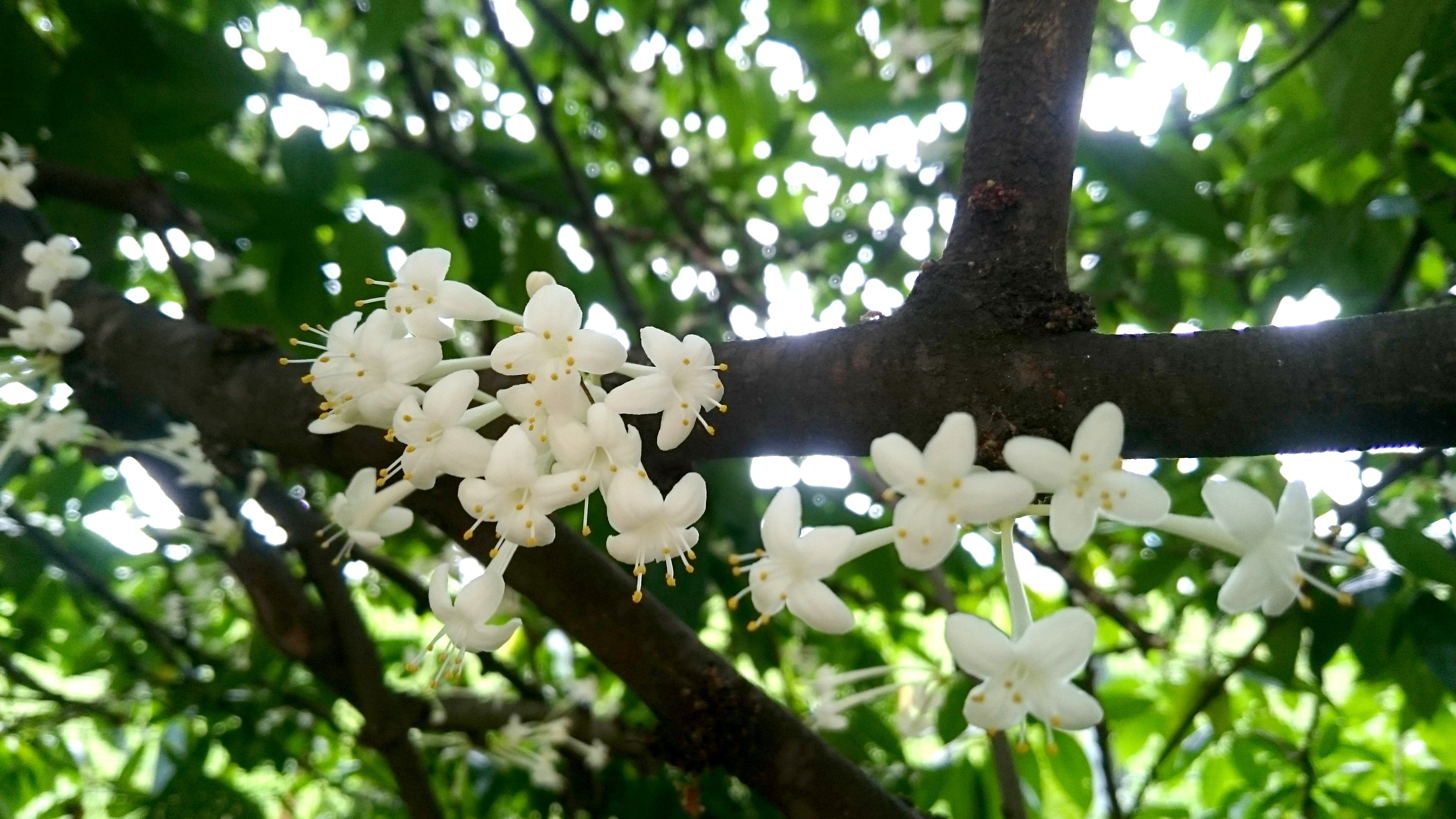
Flowers

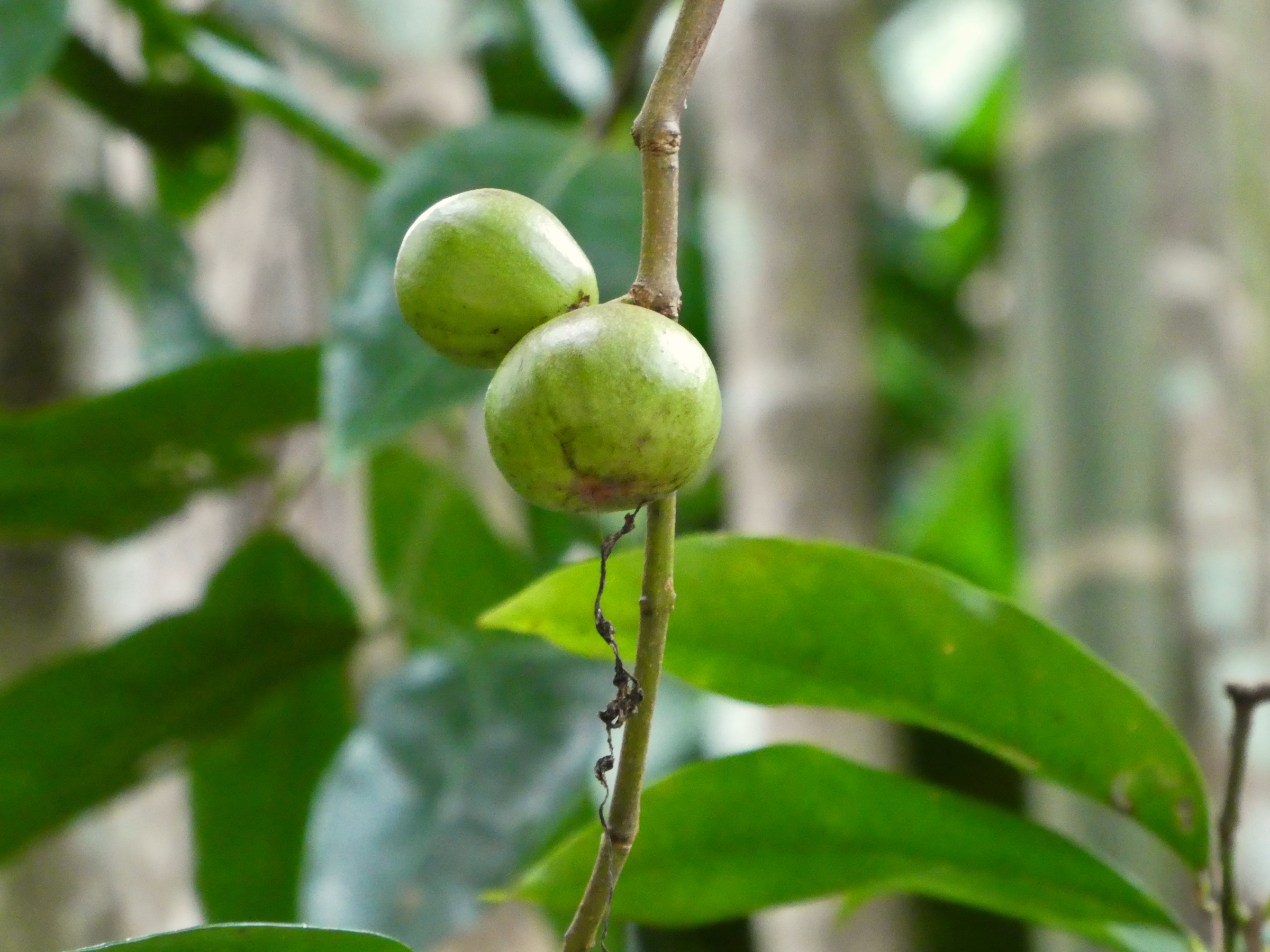
Unripe fruit

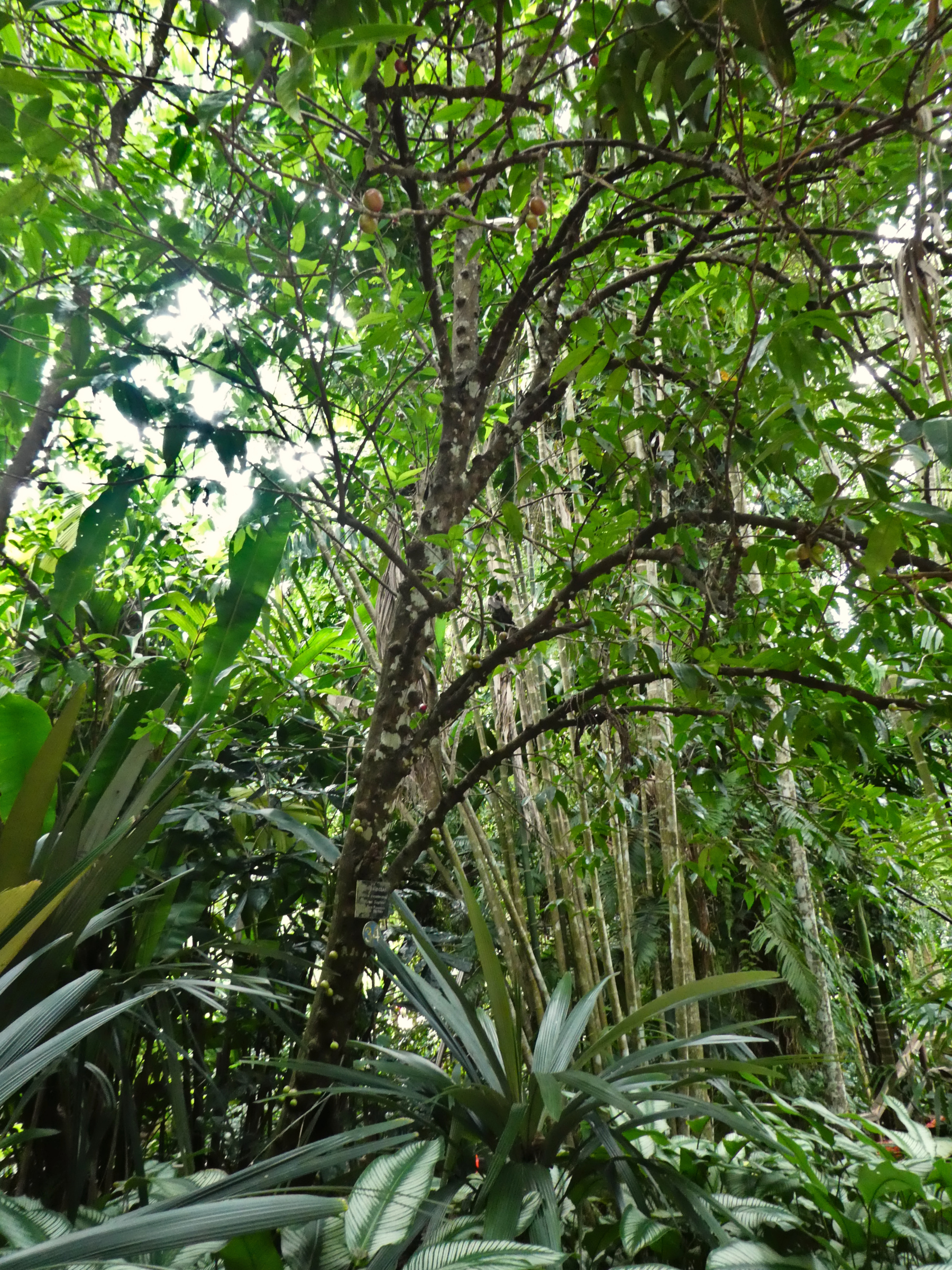
Habit, Cairns Botanic Gardens, July 2021
