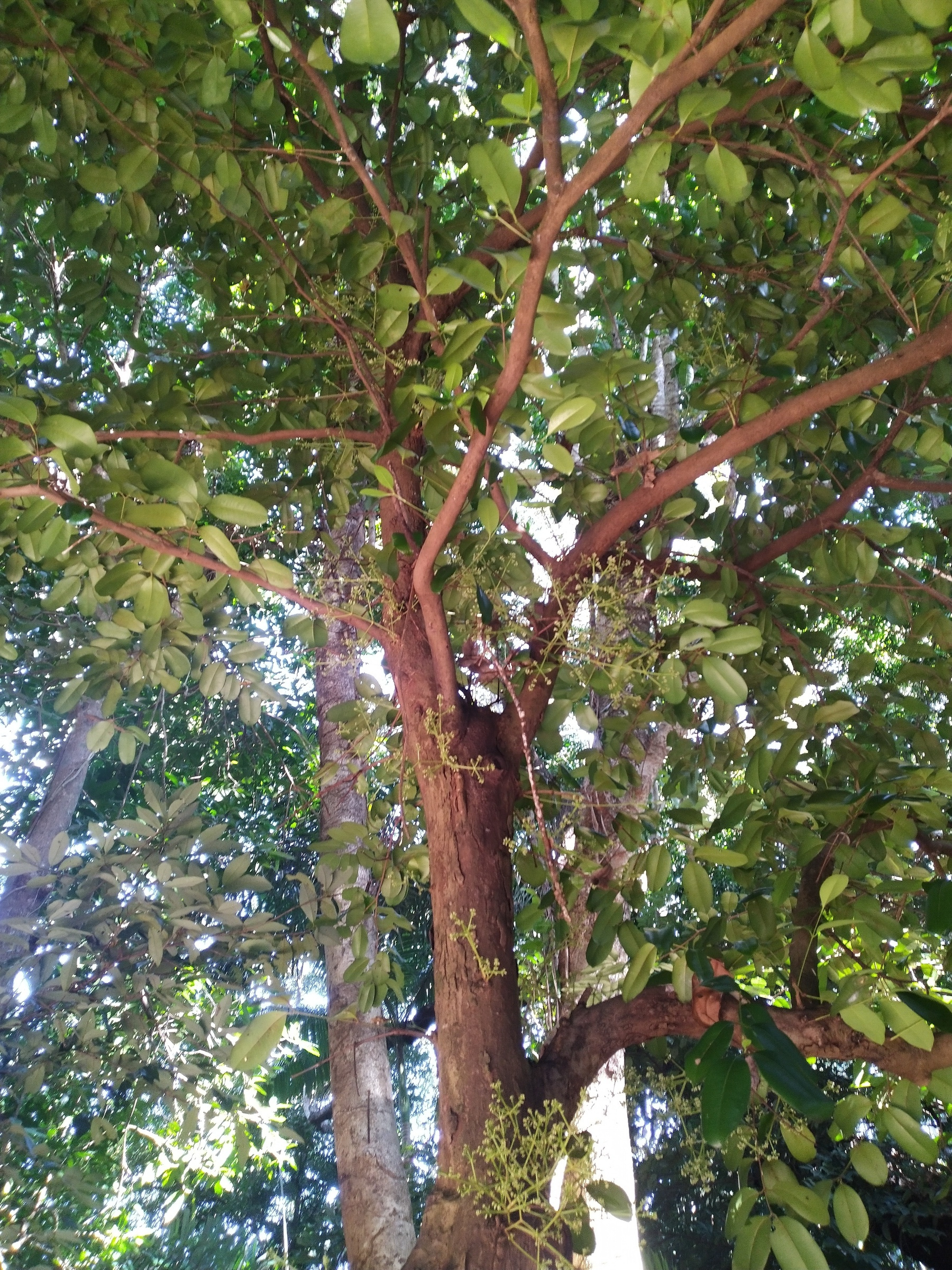
- Cairns Botanic Gardens, August 2022

Conservation status
- Least Concern (NCA)
- Least Concern (IUCN 3.1)

Scientific classification
- Kingdom: Plantae
- Clade: Tracheophytes
- Clade: Angiosperms
- Clade: Eudicots
- Clade: Rosids
- Order: Myrtales
- Family: Myrtaceae
- Genus: Syzygium
- Species: S. branderhorstii

Binomial name
- Syzygium branderhorstii Lauterb. (1910)
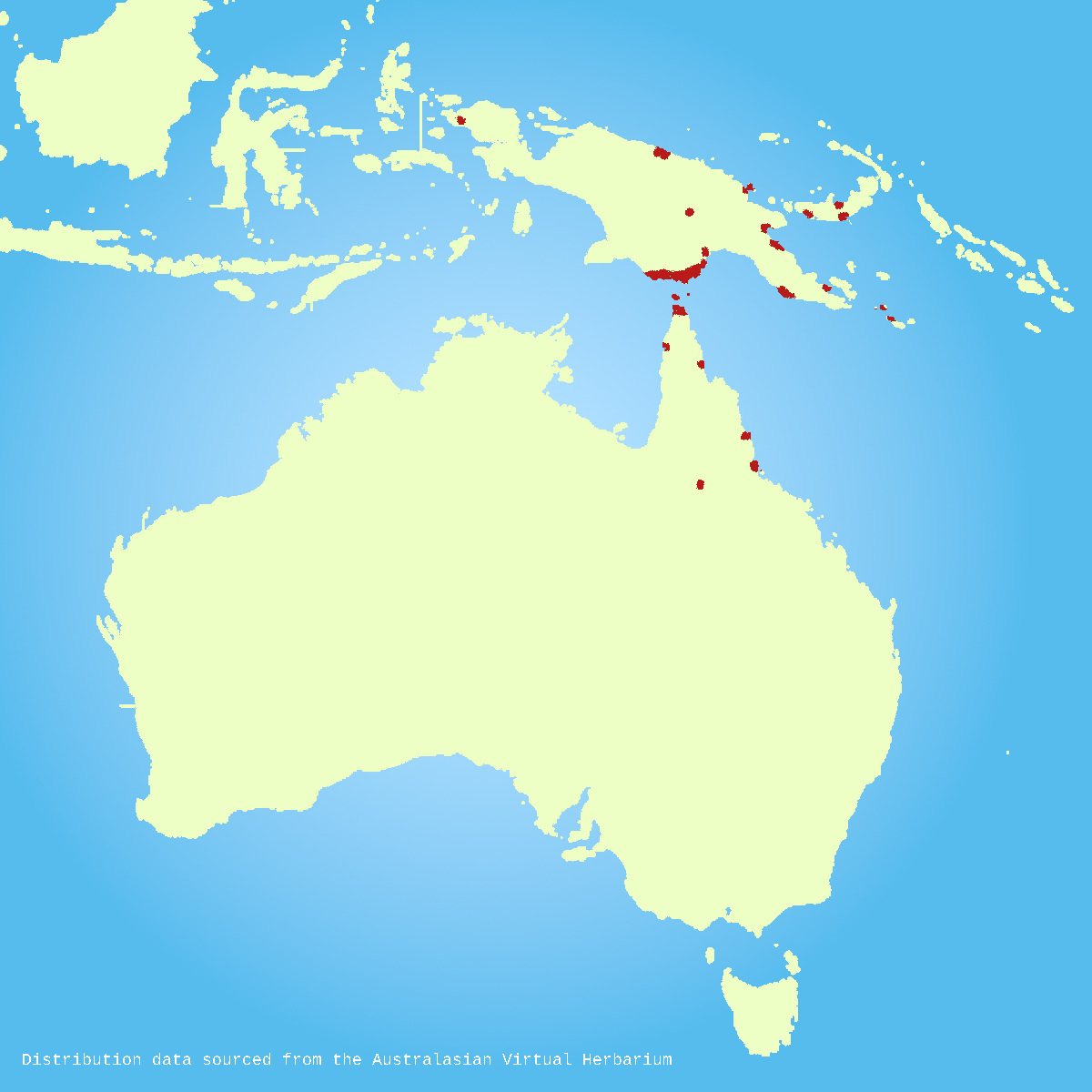

Synonyms
- Syzygium acetosum Merr. & L.M.Perry (1942); Syzygium kietanum Rech. (1912); Syzygium peekelii Diels (1922)

= Syzygium branderhorstii =

Lockerbie Satinash

Species of flowering plant

Syzygium branderhorstii, commonly known as the Lockerbie satinash, is a small tree in the family Myrtaceae found in New Guinea, the Bismarck Archipelago, Solomon Islands, Santa Cruz Islands, and northern Queensland, Australia. It is cauliflorous, producing large inflorescences from the trunk. The fruits are eaten by brush turkeys (Alectura lathami).

== Conservation ==
This species is listed by the IUCN and Queensland Government's Department of Environment and Science as least concern.

== Gallery ==
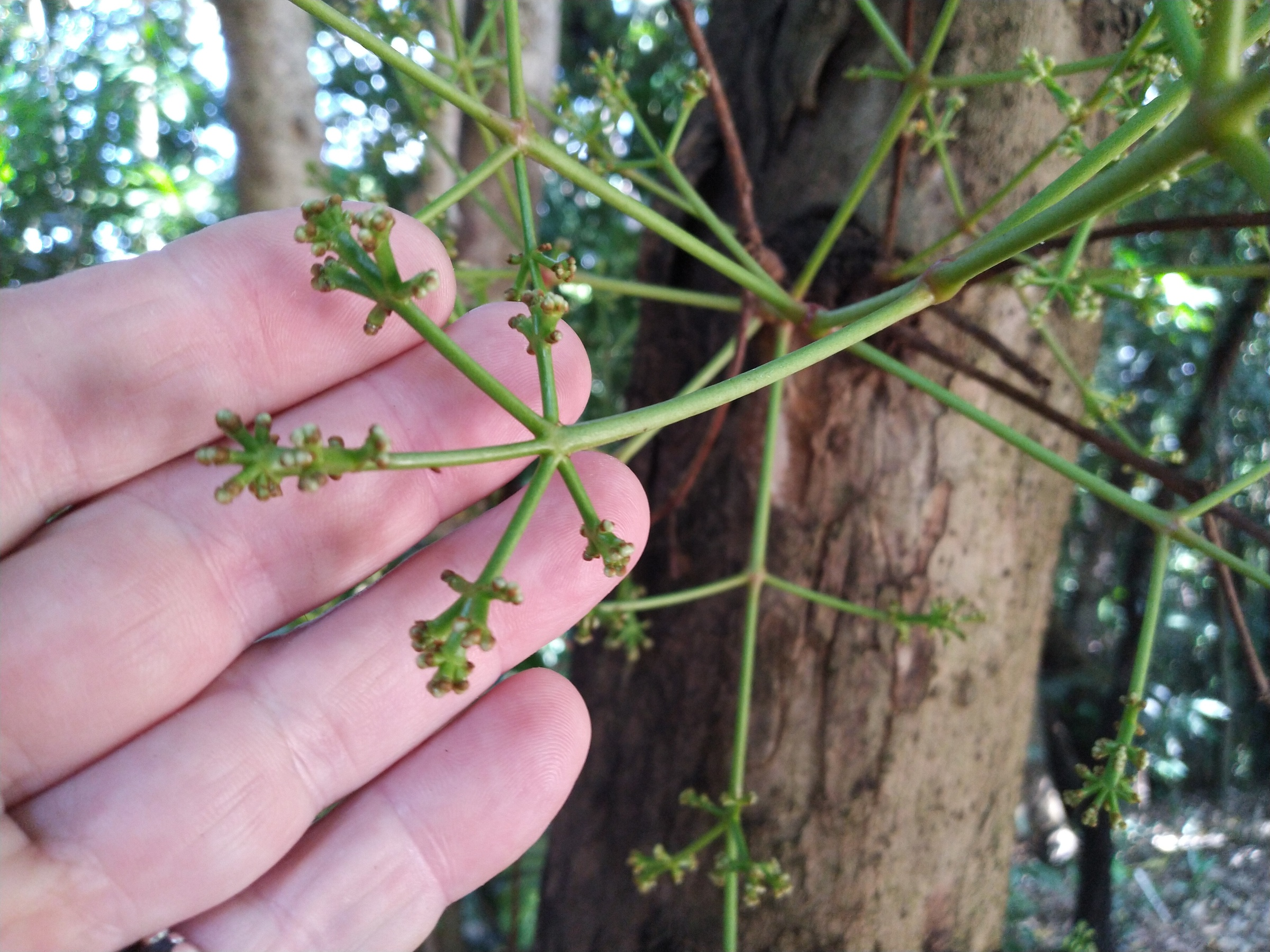

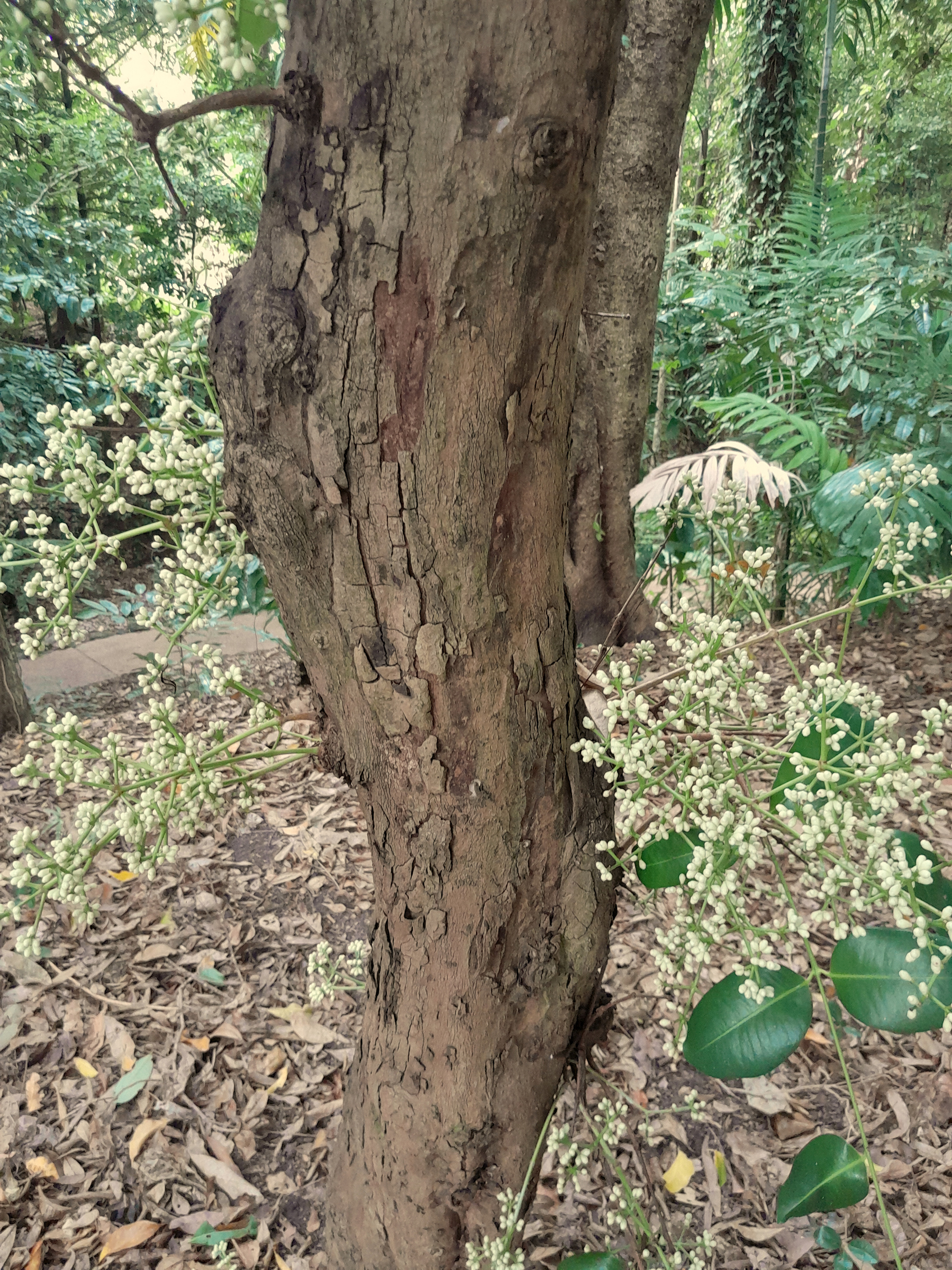

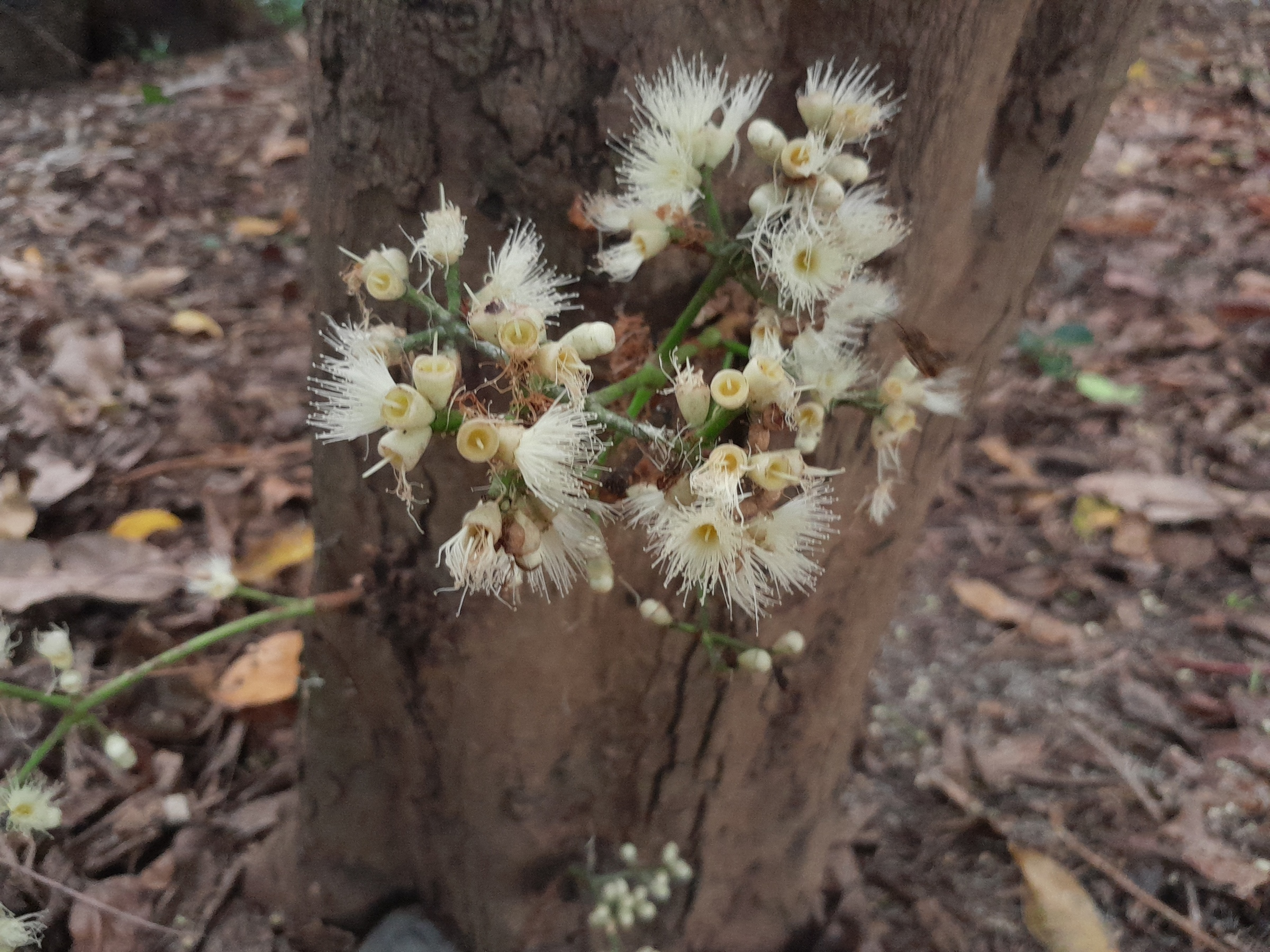
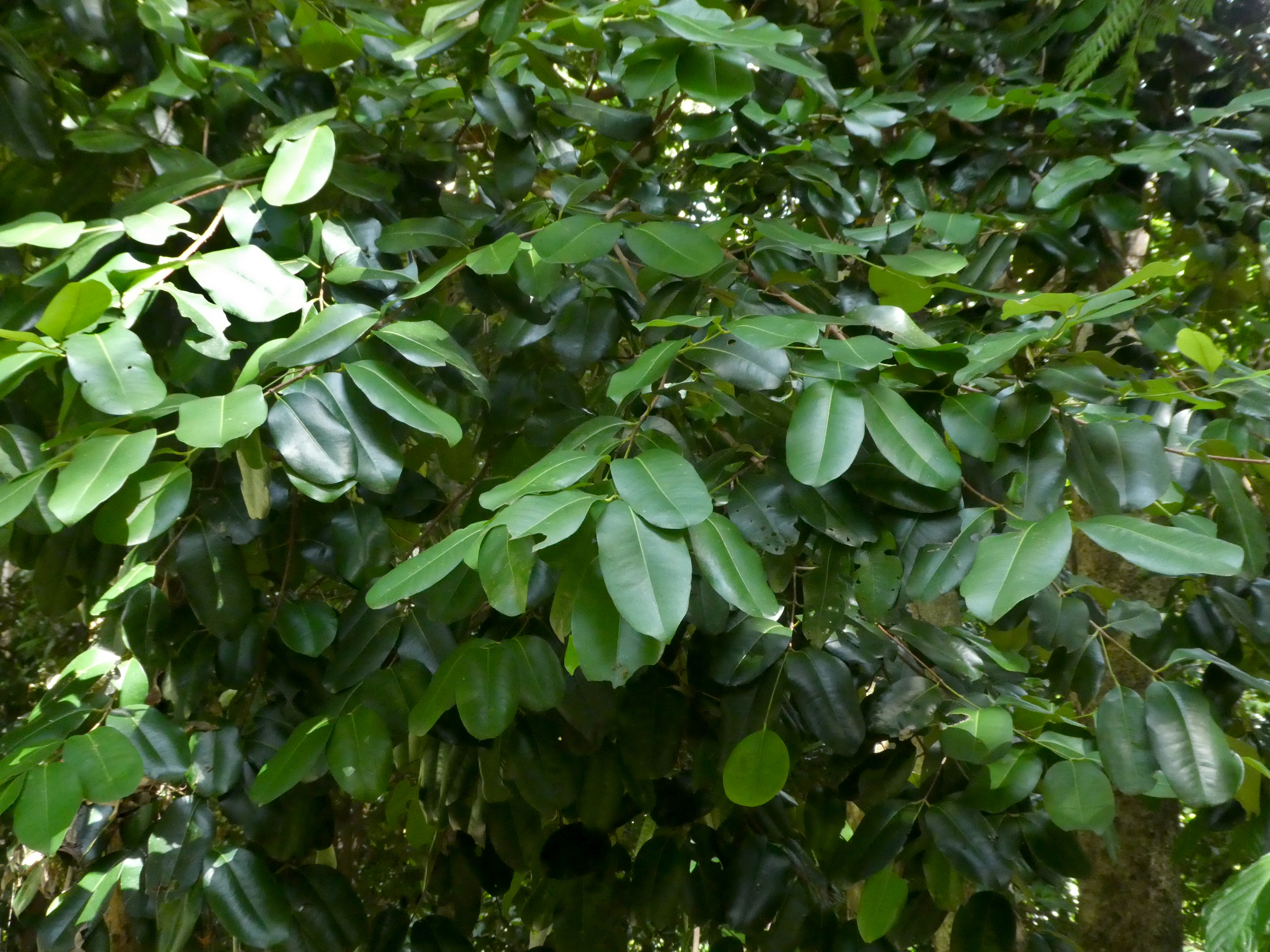

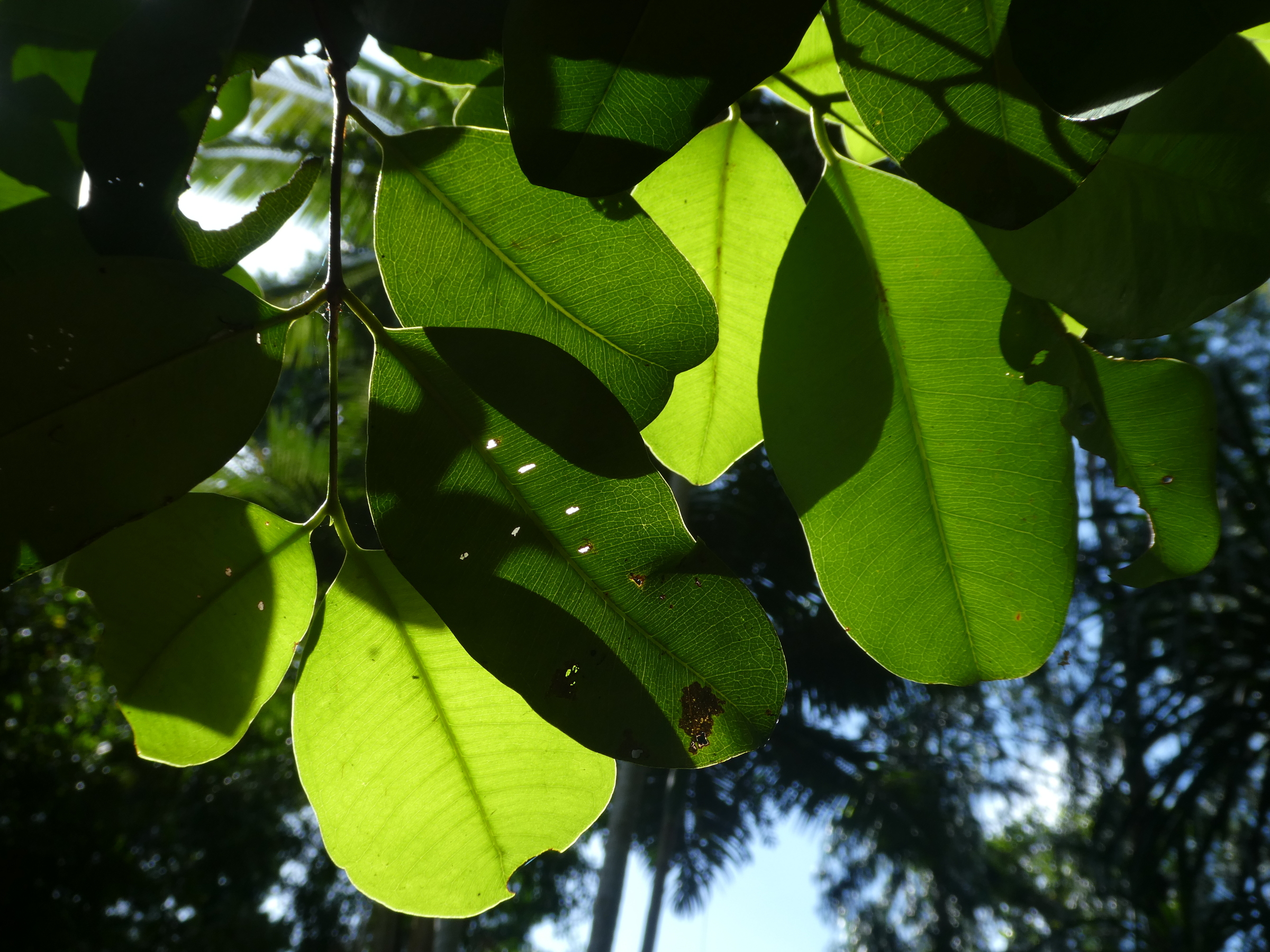

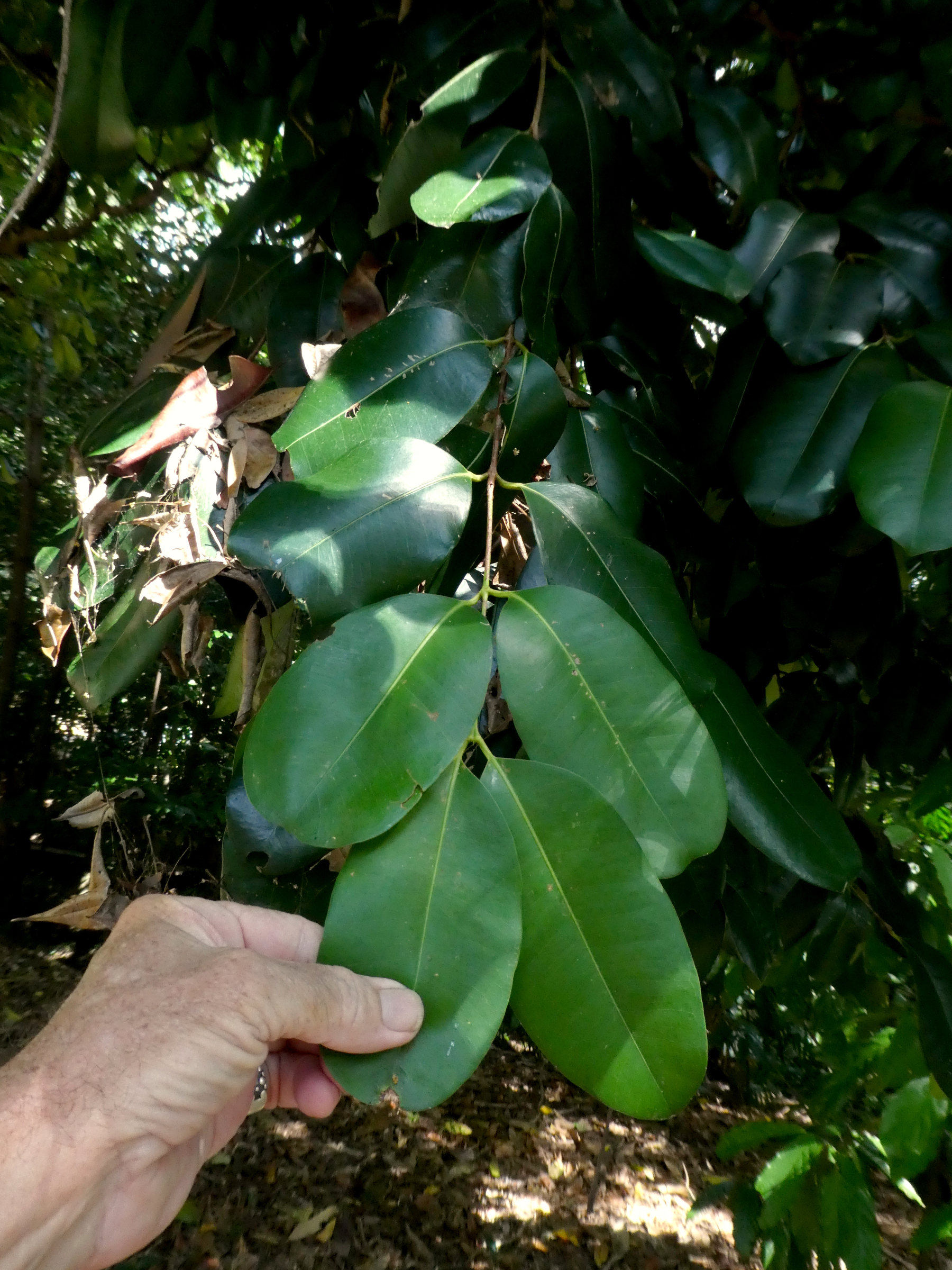
