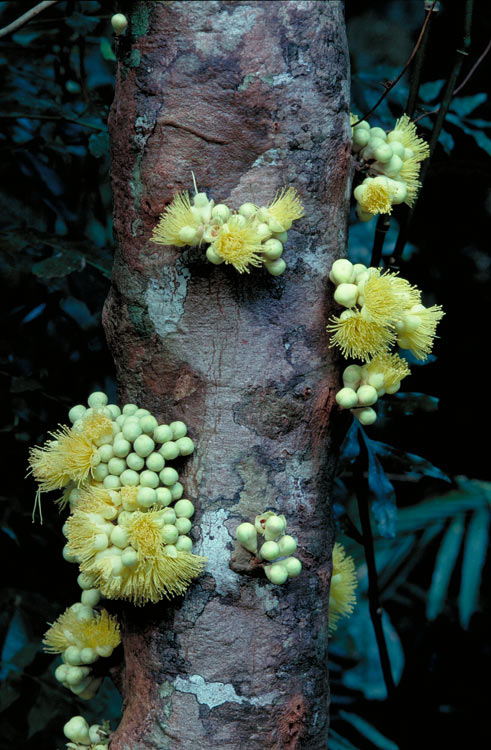

Conservation status
- Least Concern (NCA)

Scientific classification
- Kingdom: Plantae
- Clade: Tracheophytes
- Clade: Angiosperms
- Clade: Eudicots
- Clade: Rosids
- Order: Myrtales
- Family: Myrtaceae
- Genus: Syzygium
- Species: S. monospermum

Binomial name
- Syzygium monospermum Craven, 2003

= Syzygium monospermum =

Species of flowering plant

Syzygium monospermum, known commonly as the Daintree satinash, is a species of flowering plant in the family Myrtaceae that is endemic to Queensland in Australia.

== Habitat & distribution ==
The species can only be found in the Daintree Rainforest.

== Description ==
This species grows as a tree to a height of 20 metres. The species has a perennial life cycle and is hermaphroditic. The flowering time of this species is from May to August and the fruiting time is from October to December. The species is cauliflorous and has fleshy, indehiscent, baccate and/or drupaceous fruit. Seeds of this species are dispersed by mammals. The leaves are 300 millimetres long and 93 millimetres wide. The species is evergreen.

== Conservation ==
Under the Nature Conservation Act 1992 in Queensland it has been classified as Least Concern.
