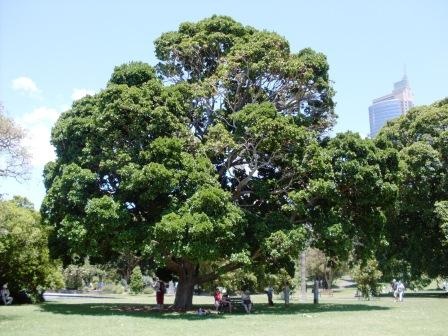
- Syzygium moorei – Couchy Creek, NSW/Qld border

Conservation status
- Vulnerable (EPBC Act)

Scientific classification
- Kingdom: Plantae
- Clade: Tracheophytes
- Clade: Angiosperms
- Clade: Eudicots
- Clade: Rosids
- Order: Myrtales
- Family: Myrtaceae
- Genus: Syzygium
- Species: S. moorei

Binomial name
- Syzygium moorei (F.Muell.) L.A.S.Johnson

Synonyms
- Eugenia moorei F.Muell

= Syzygium moorei =

Coolamon

Species of tree

Syzygium moorei is a rare sub tropical rainforest tree, growing on volcanic soils in the Mount Warning area of north east New South Wales and south east Queensland, Australia. Common names include coolamon, watermelon tree, durobby and robby; it is also called "rose apple" but this can refer to many species of Syzygium.

== Description ==
Syzgyium moorei is a canopy tree of sub tropical rainforest, reaching 40 metres in height, and a trunk of 60 centimetres wide. The bark is a grey/fawn/reddish colour. The tree is not buttressed at the base; some larger specimens are flanged at the base.

The leaves are unusual for a New South Wales myrtle, being large, thick and heavy, 8 to 20 cm long with a short blunt point at the tip.

=== Flowers and fruit ===
An unusual characteristic of this tree is ramiflory, where flowers and fruits form out of the main branches behind the leaves, rather than from new growth and shoots. This is mostly a tropical feature, and unusual in rainforest trees so far south in New South Wales.

In November to February, pink or orange flowers form in dense panicles on mature branches. The berry is white or pale green and up to 6 cm in diameter, maturing around Easter time. The fruit is not pleasant to eat raw, but is an excellent ingredient in mixed preserves. The large seed germinates well after many months. Most seedlings appear in November and December.

== Location ==
A few mature specimens can still be seen in the farmland areas in their former range near streams at low altitude. This tree is in many botanic gardens in Australia. The pink flowers and beautiful form make it a popular park and garden tree; there is a superb specimen at the Royal Botanic Gardens, Sydney. It's also seen as a street tree in Murwillumbah, Brisbane and other nearby localities.

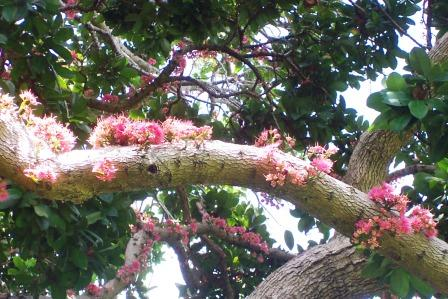
Pink flowers at New Year

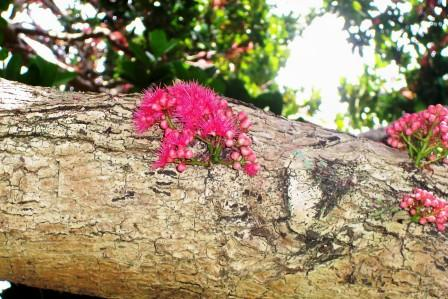
Close up of ramiflory

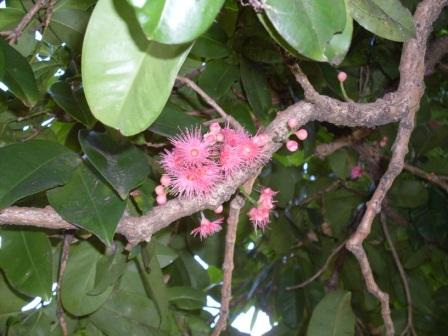
Flowers & foliage

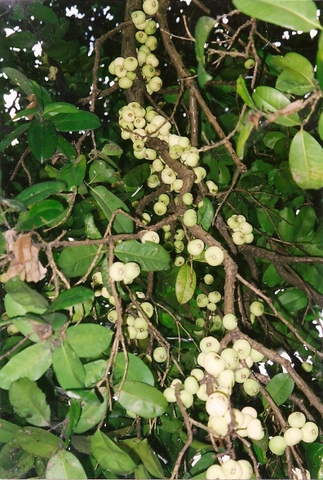
Fruit
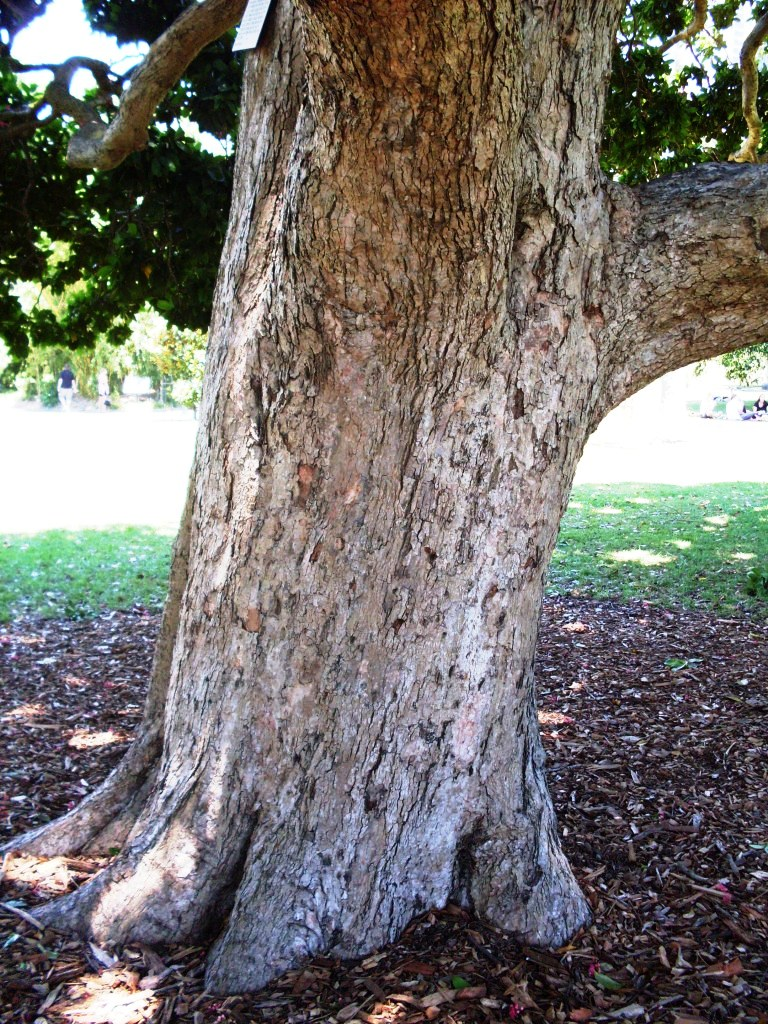
Trunk

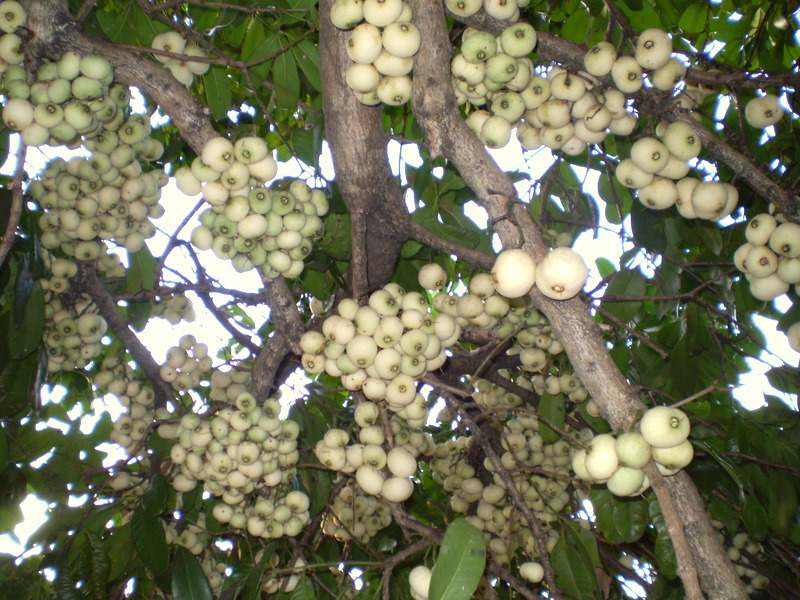
Fruit showing ramiiflory
