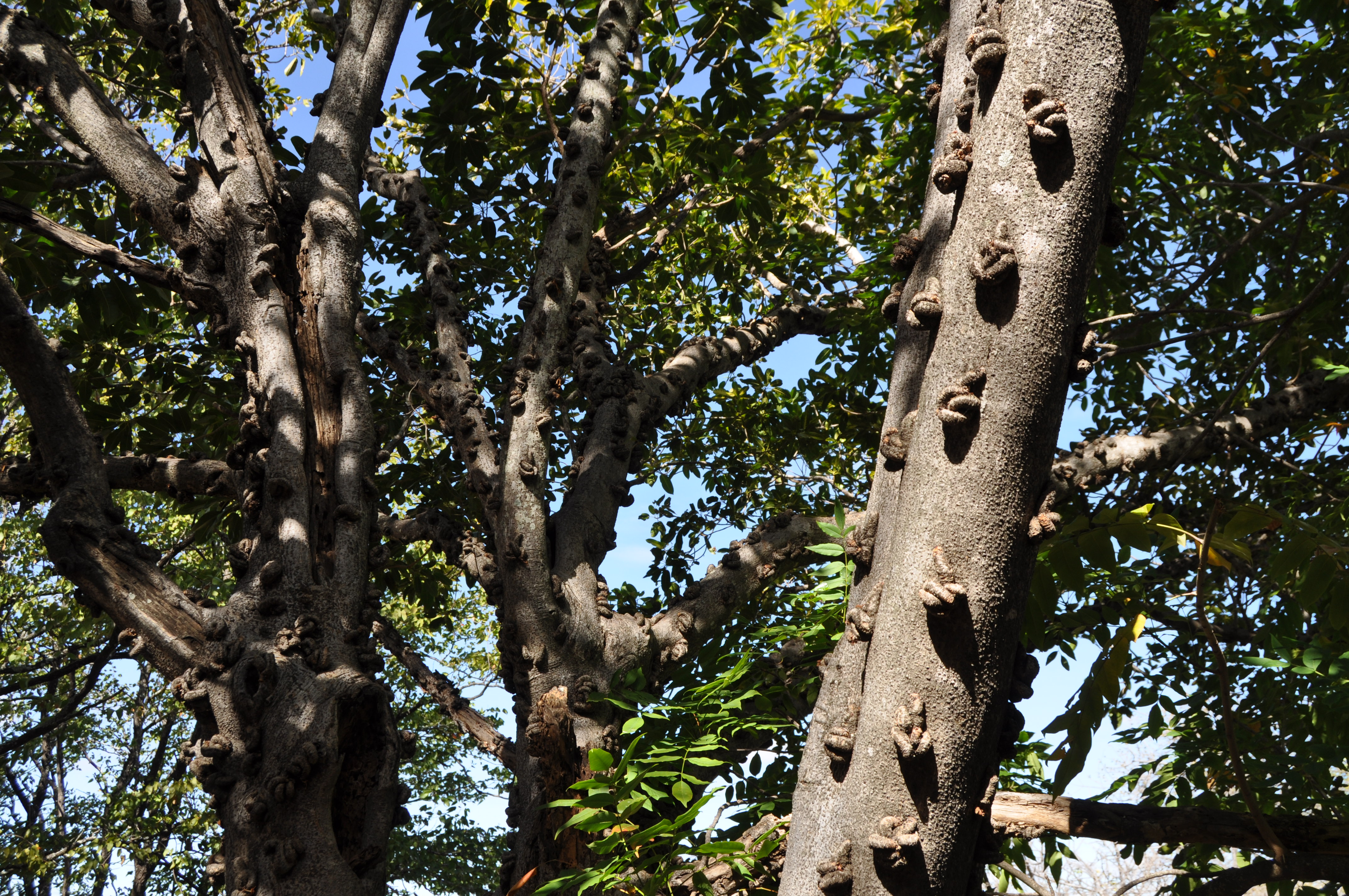

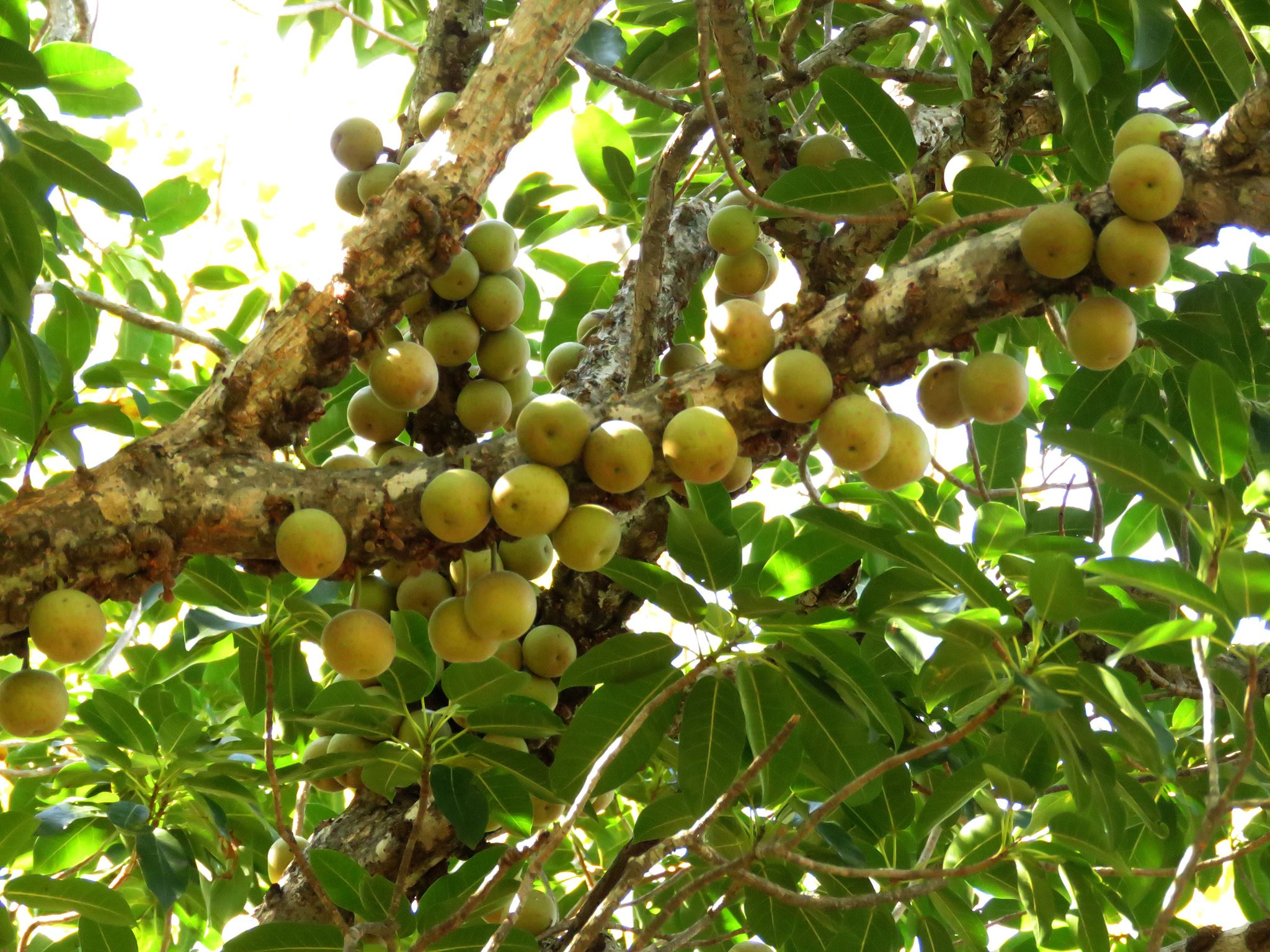
- The nominate subsp. in the Kruger Park

Scientific classification
- Kingdom: Plantae
- Clade: Tracheophytes
- Clade: Angiosperms
- Clade: Eudicots
- Clade: Rosids
- Order: Rosales
- Family: Moraceae
- Genus: Ficus
- Species: F. sansibarica

Binomial name
- Ficus sansibarica Warb. 1894

Synonyms
- F. brachylepis Welw. ex Hiern; F. delagoensis T. R. Sim; F. gossweileri Hutch.; F. langenburgii Warb.; F. ugandensis Hutch.; F. zanzibarica Boeck. ex Engl.

= Ficus sansibarica =

Knobbly fig

Species of tree

The Ficus sansibarica, known as knobbly fig, is an African species of cauliflorous fig. It is named after Zanzibar, where Franz Stuhlmann discovered it in 1889. They often begin life as epiphytes, which assume a strangling habit as they develop. They regularly reach 10 m, but may grow up to 40 m tall as forest stranglers.

== Range and habitat ==
It occurs in the African tropics and subtropics from coastal elevations to 900 m above sea level. The nominate subspecies has an easterly distribution, but extends westwards up the Zambezi Valley.

They are found in coastal, riverine and evergreen forests or woodland, and in miombo woodlands. They are locally cultivated in parks, villages or bush camps. They prefer deep sandy soil and often start life as a strangler. The pollinating wasp is Courtella armata.

== Description ==
The light grey bark is fairly smooth, though lumpy and folded. The smooth leaves are up to 13 cm long and oblong-obovate. They have parallel sides and are carried on slender petioles.

The large (up to 5 cm), bitter-tasting figs appear in groups of 2 or 3 during the summer months. They are cauliflorous, growing on the characteristic wart-like, leafless branchlets on the trunk and main branches (i.e. old wood).

F. chirindensis of the forests of southeastern Zimbabwe and adjacent Mozambique is similar, but has the leaves more oval, often has buttress roots, and bears the small (1.5 cm) figs in stalked pairs on second year branches.

== Uses ==
The raw figs are used for food, and are locally believed to promote fertility. Stems are torn apart to obtain fibers for basket weaving. Locally it is also deemed sacred.

== Subspecies and status ==
- F. s. subsp. sansibarica – East Africa: southern Kenya, Tanzania, Malawi, Zambia, northern Botswana, Zimbabwe, Mozambique, northeastern South Africa and Eswatini
- F. s. subsp. macrosperma (Warb. ex Mildbr. & Burret) C.C.Berg – West and Central Africa: Senegal to DRC, Uganda and Angola

The species is deemed critically endangered in Eswatini, where most are located in proposed sugar cane expansion areas near Sihoye. On Inhaca Island however, it is held sacred by most communities, and is scrupulously protected.

== Gallery ==
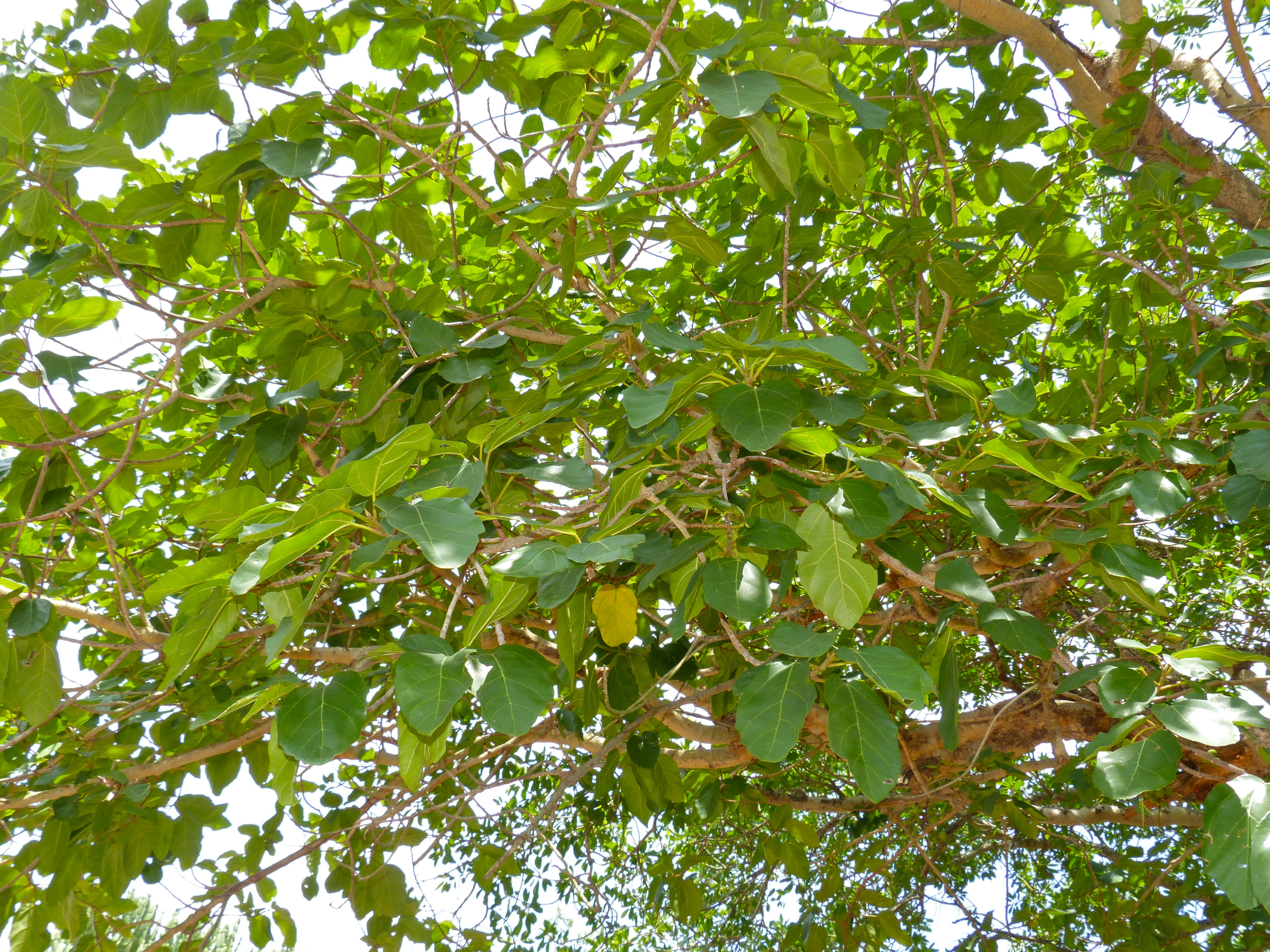
Foliage

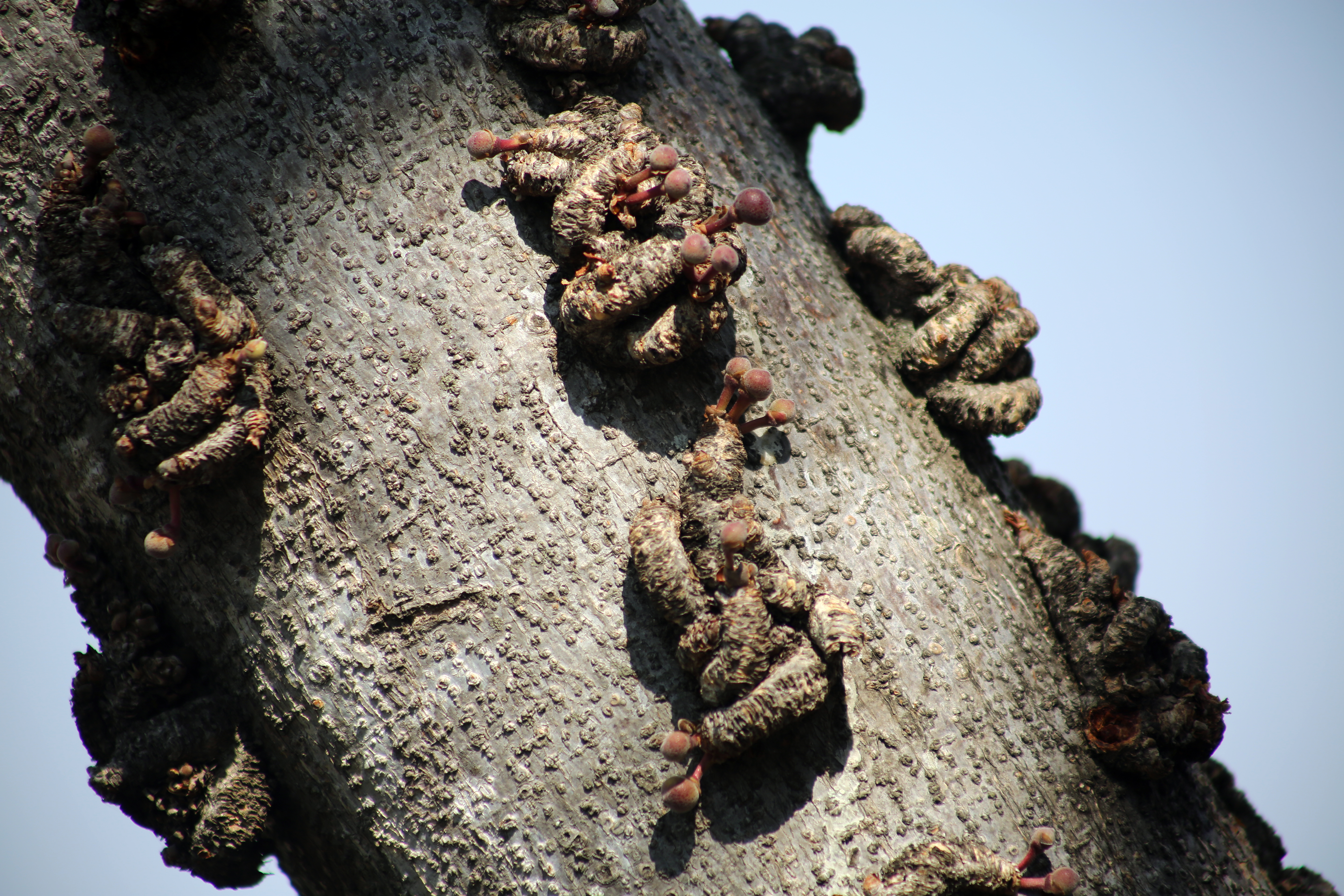
Figs on wart-like branchlets

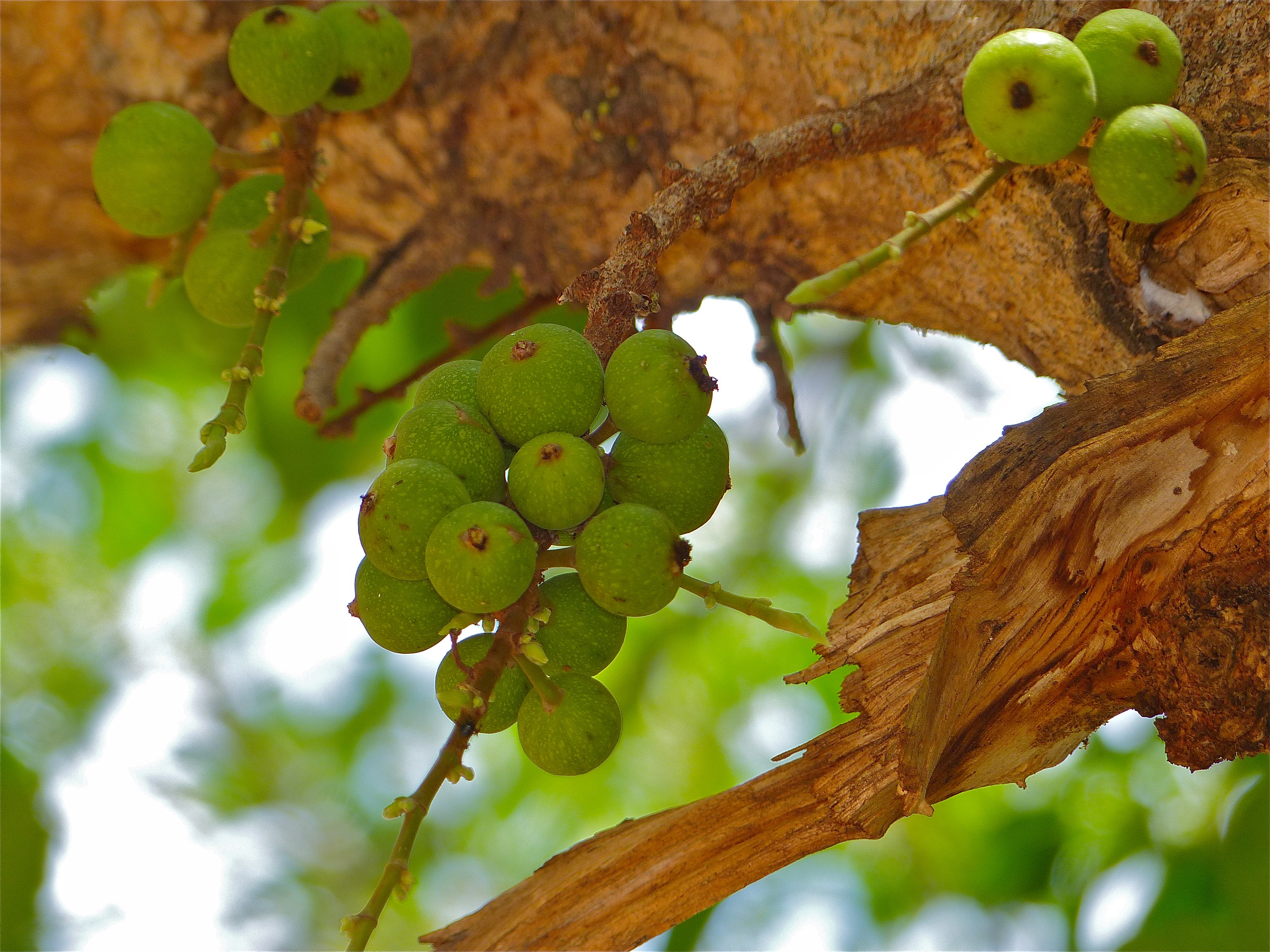
Figs carried on spurs
