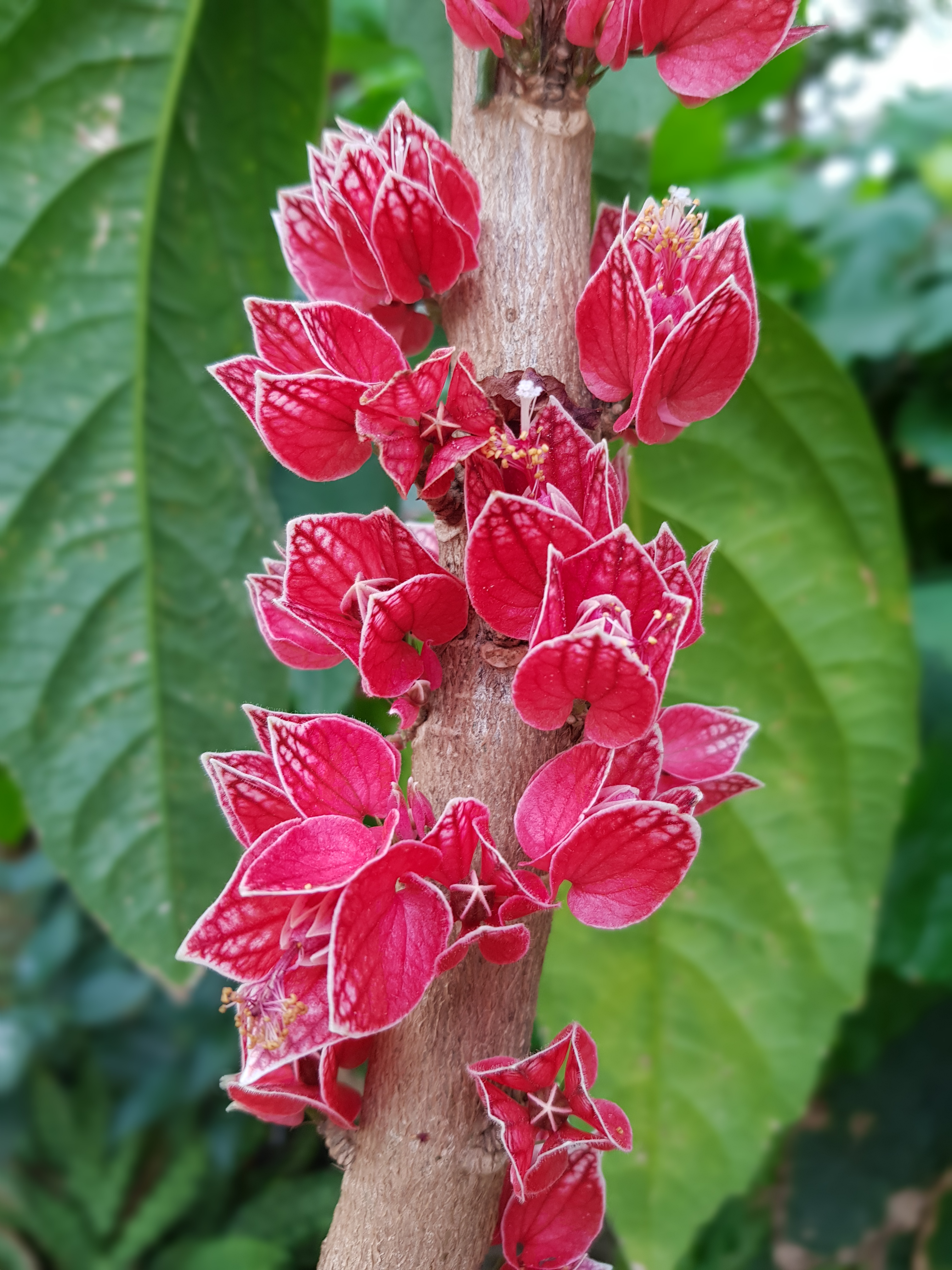

Scientific classification
- Kingdom: Plantae
- Clade: Embryophytes
- Clade: Tracheophytes
- Clade: Spermatophytes
- Clade: Angiosperms
- Clade: Eudicots
- Clade: Rosids
- Order: Malvales
- Family: Malvaceae
- Genus: Pavonia
- Species: P. strictiflora

Binomial name
- Pavonia strictiflora (Hook.) G.L.Esteves

Synonyms
- Goethea strictiflora Hook. (1852)

= Pavonia strictiflora =

Species of plant

Pavonia strictiflora is a species of Pavonia found in Bahia and São Paulo, Brazil.
