= Ramiflory =

Botanical term

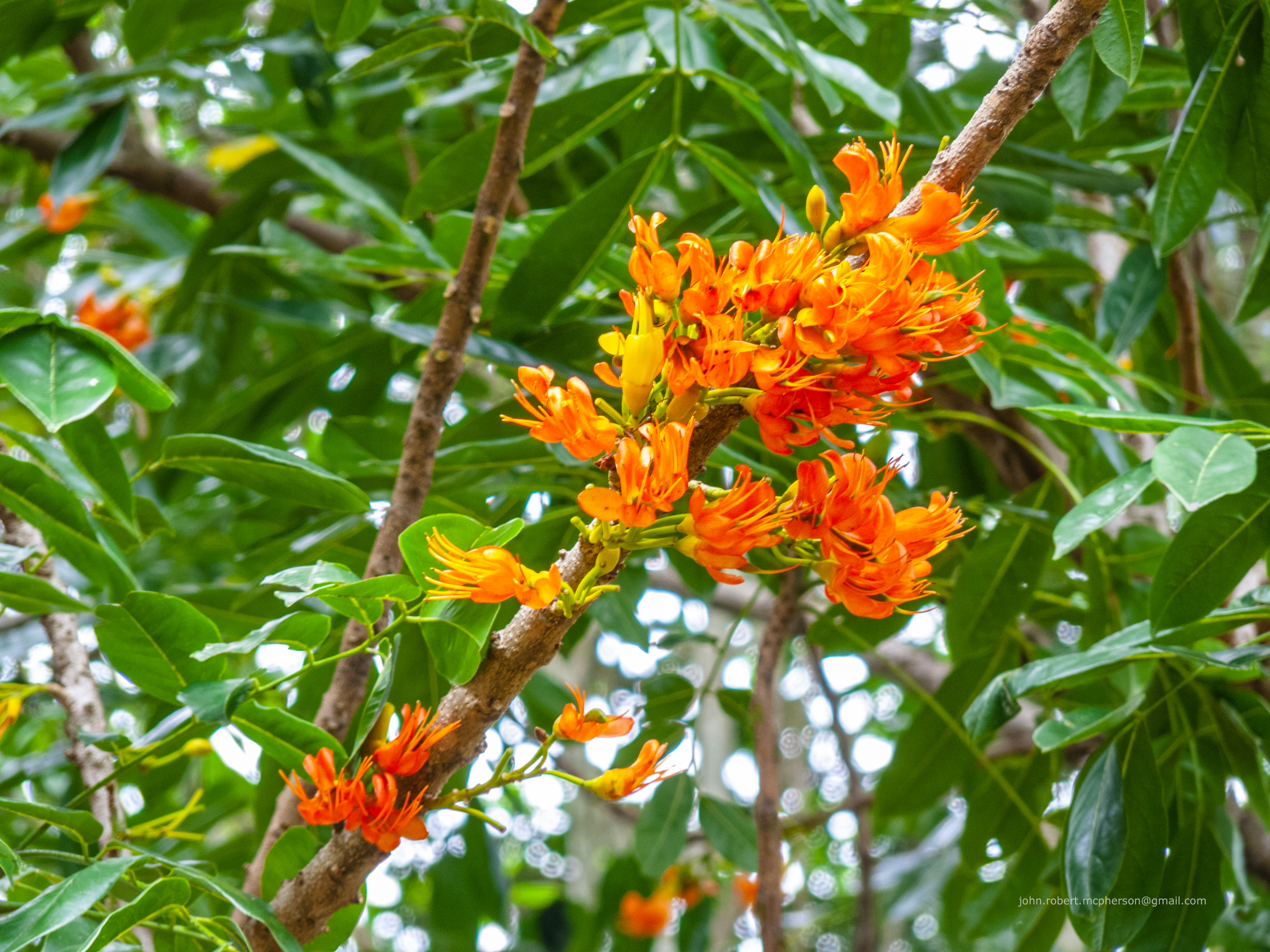
Castanospermum australe (Ramiflory borne flower)

In plant biology, ramiflory is the production of fruit and flowers on the woody branches of a plant, formed in a previous season. The corresponding condition for the trunk of the plant is known as cauliflory.
