= List of Pavonia species =

Plants of the World Online recognises about 300 accepted taxa (of species and infraspecific names) in the plant genus Pavonia of the mallow family Malvaceae.

== A ==
- Pavonia achanioides Griseb.
- Pavonia alba Seem.
- Pavonia alia Fryxell
- Pavonia almasana Ulbr.
- Pavonia alnifolia A.St.-Hil.
- Pavonia angustifolia Benth.
- Pavonia angustipetala Krapov. & Cristóbal
- Pavonia anisaster (Standl.) Fryxell
- Pavonia apiculata R.E.Fr.
- Pavonia arabica Hochst. & Steud. ex Boiss.
- Pavonia arachnoides C.Presl
- Pavonia arenaria (Murray) Roth
- Pavonia argentina Gürke
- Pavonia aschersoniana Gürke
- Pavonia aschersonioides Fryxell
- Pavonia aspera Hassl.
- Pavonia atlantica Fryxell
- Pavonia aurantia Alain
- Pavonia aurelii Fryxell
- Pavonia aurigloba Krapov. & Cristóbal

== B ==
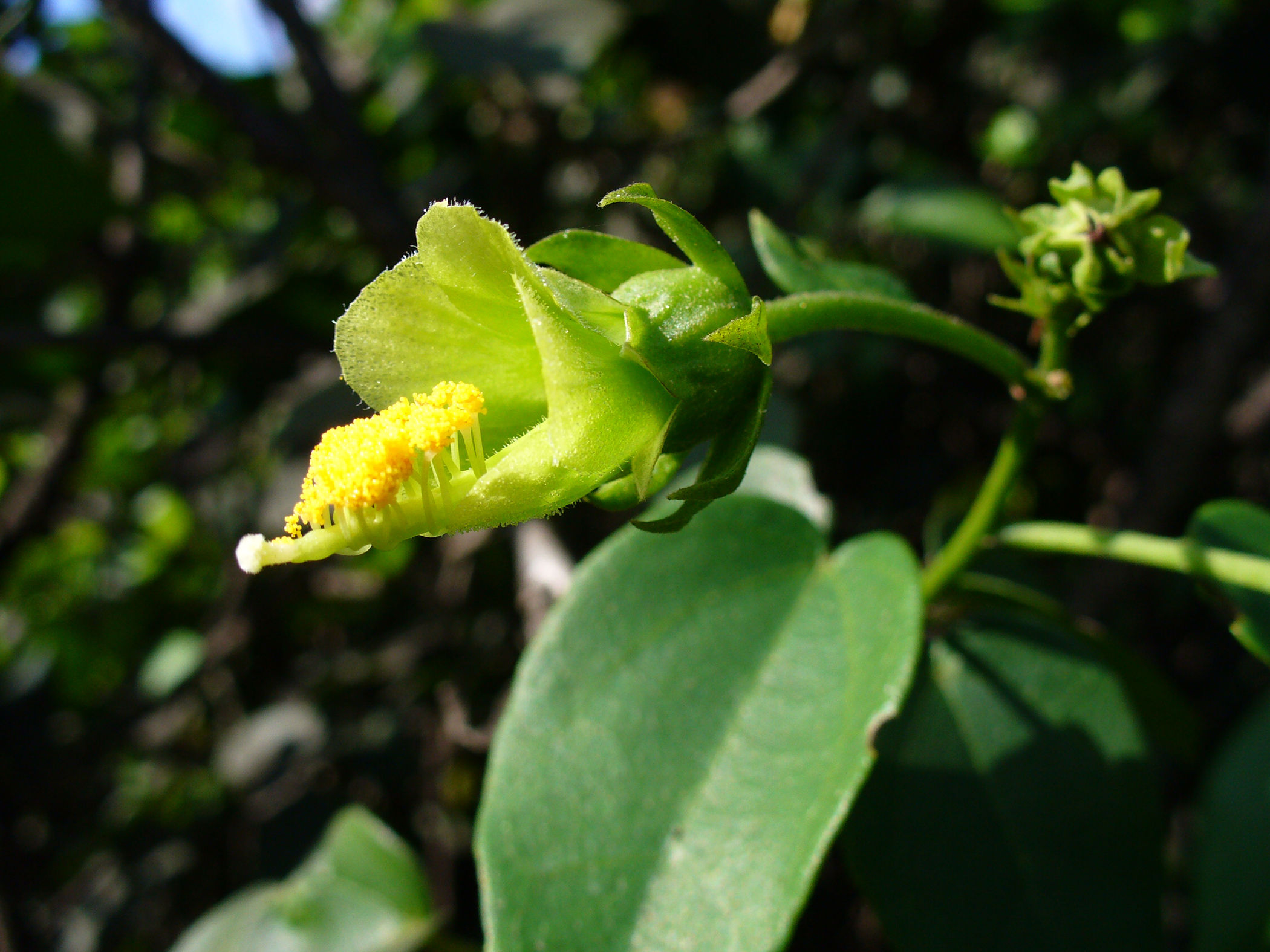
Pavonia bahamensis

- Pavonia bahamensis Hitchc.
- Pavonia baillonii Hochr.
- Pavonia balansae Gürke
- Pavonia baumliana Fryxell
- Pavonia belophylla Hochr.
- Pavonia betonicifolia C.Presl
- Pavonia biflora Fryxell
- Pavonia blanchetiana Miq.
- Pavonia blepharicarpa N.A.Brummitt & Vollesen
- Pavonia brevibracteolata Hauman
- Pavonia bullulata Hochr.
- Pavonia burchellii (DC.) R.A.Dyer

== C ==
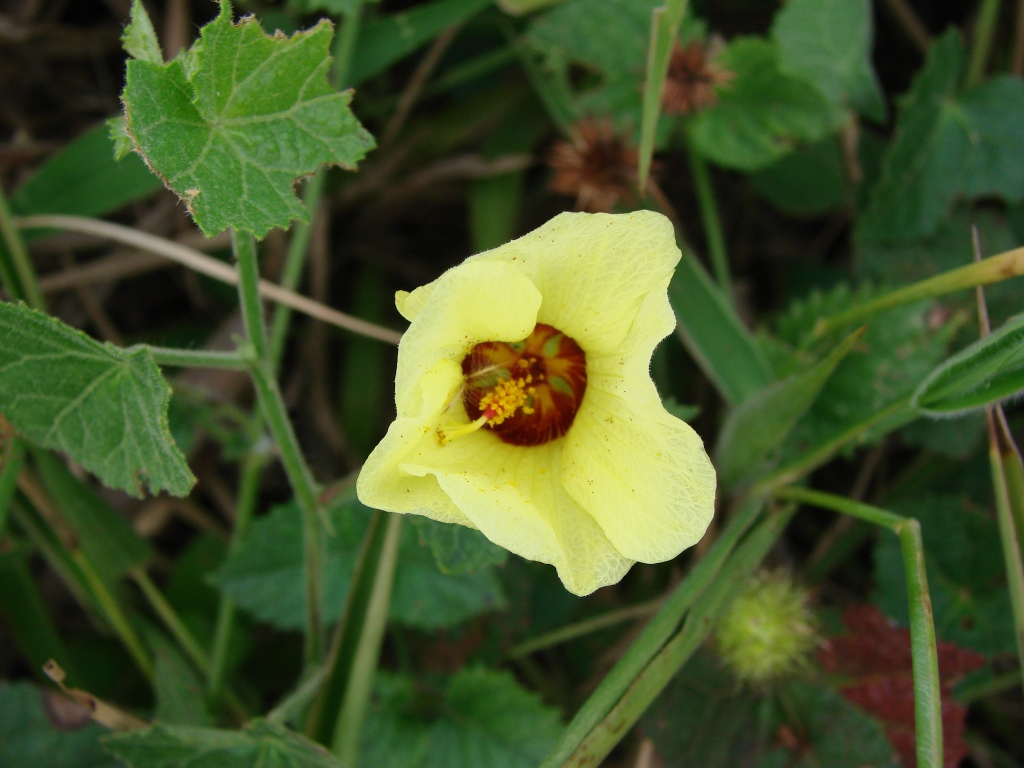
Pavonia cancellata

- Pavonia cabraliana Krapov.
- Pavonia calcicola (Britton) Ekman
- Pavonia calycina (Cav.) Ulbr.
- Pavonia calyculosa A.St.-Hil. & Naudin
- Pavonia cancellata (L.) Cav.
- Pavonia candida (DC.) Fryxell
- Pavonia capivarensis Krapov.
- Pavonia castaneifolia A.St.-Hil. & Naudin
- Pavonia cauliflora (Nees) Fryxell ex G.L.Esteves
- Pavonia chiquitensis J.R.I.Wood
- Pavonia chlorantha (Kunth) Fryxell
- Pavonia ciliata G.L.Esteves & Krapov.
- Pavonia clarkii Fryxell
- Pavonia clathrata Mast.
- Pavonia coccinea Cav.
- Pavonia cochensis J.R.Johnst.
- Pavonia columella Cav.
- Pavonia communis A.St.-Hil.
- Pavonia commutata Garcke
- Pavonia conferta A.St.-Hil.
- Pavonia corymbosa (Sw.) Willd.
- Pavonia cracens Fryxell & G.L.Esteves
- Pavonia crassipedicellata Krapov.
- Pavonia crispa Krapov.
- Pavonia cristaliana Krapov.
- Pavonia cristata Schinz ex Gürke
- Pavonia cristobaliae Fryxell
- Pavonia cryptica Krapov. & Cristóbal
- Pavonia cryptocalyx Urb.
- Pavonia cymbalaria A.St.-Hil. & Naudin

== D ==
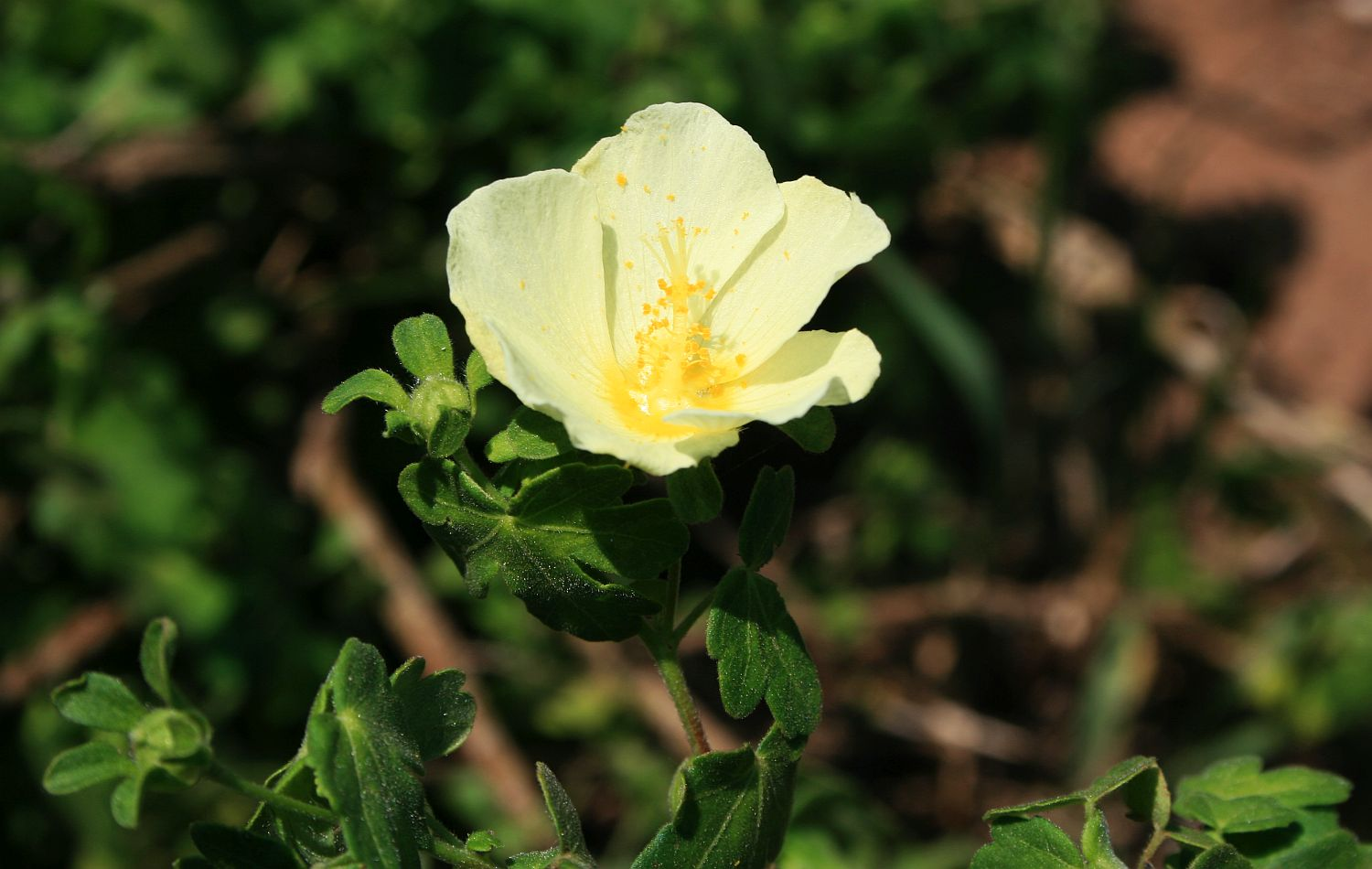
Pavonia dregei

- Pavonia dasypetala Turcz.
- Pavonia decora Fryxell
- Pavonia dentata Burtt Davy
- Pavonia dimorphostemon Verdc.
- Pavonia distinguenda A.St.-Hil. & Naudin
- Pavonia domatiifera J.Florence
- Pavonia dregei Garcke
- Pavonia ducke-limae Monteiro
- Pavonia durangensis Fryxell
- Pavonia dusenii Krapov.

== E ==
- Pavonia ecostata Fryxell & S.D.Koch
- Pavonia ekmanii Helwig
- Pavonia elegans Garcke
- Pavonia ellenbeckii Gürke
- Pavonia eremogeiton Ulbr.
- Pavonia erythrolema Gürke
- Pavonia eurychlamys Ulbr.
- Pavonia exasperata Grings & Boldrini

== F ==
- Pavonia falconensis Fryxell
- Pavonia filiformis J.R.I.Wood
- Pavonia firmiflora Schery
- Pavonia flavispina Miq.
- Pavonia flavoferruginea (Forssk.) Hepper & J.R.I.Wood
- Pavonia fonsecana (Standl.) Fryxell
- Pavonia formosa Fryxell
- Pavonia friesii Krapov.
- Pavonia friisii Thulin & Vollesen
- Pavonia froesii Fryxell
- Pavonia fruticosa (Mill.) Fawc. & Rendle
- Pavonia fryxelliana Fosberg & Sachet
- Pavonia fryxellii Krapov.

== G ==
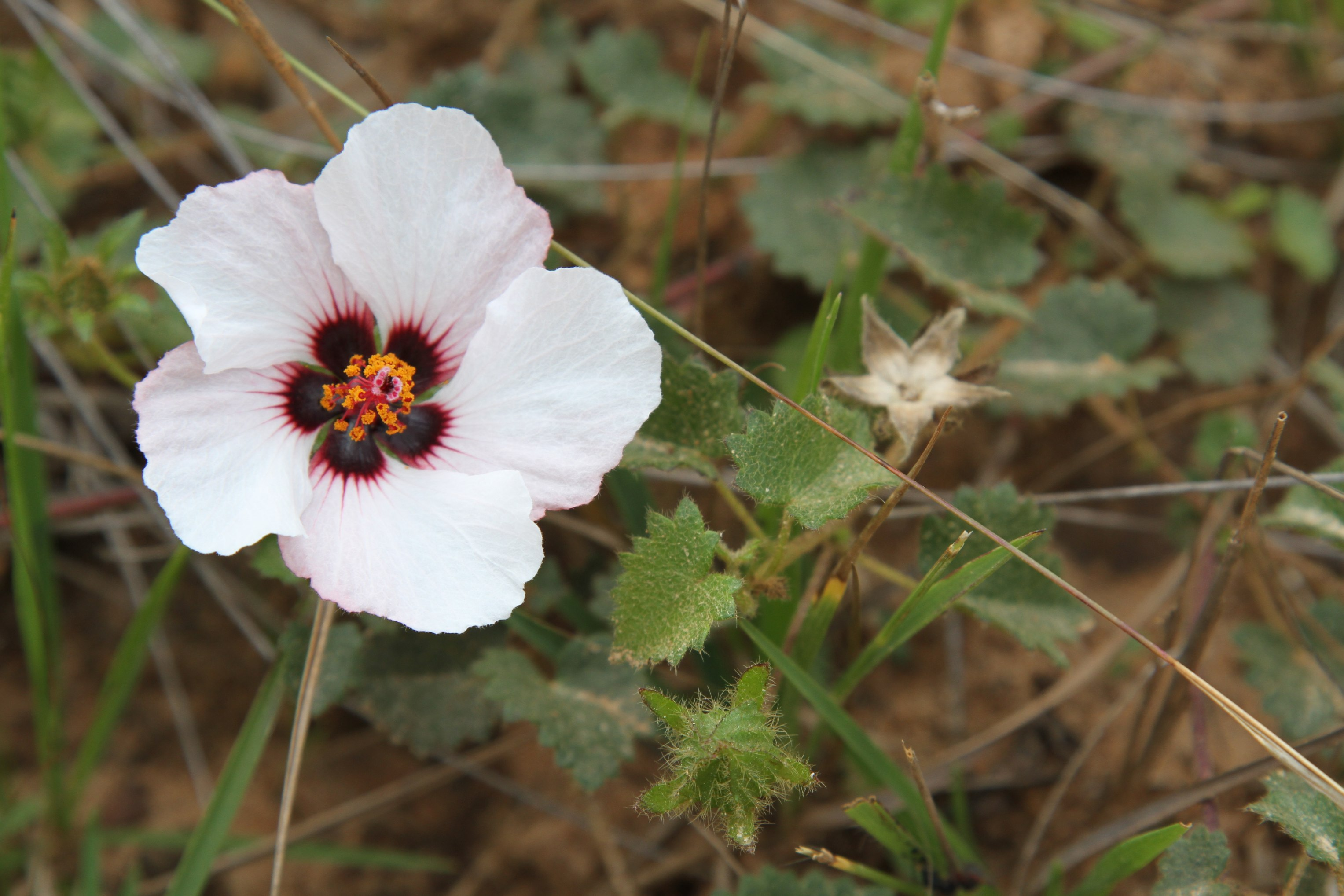
Pavonia glechomoides

- Pavonia gallaensis Ulbr.
- Pavonia garckeana Gürke
- Pavonia geminiflora Moric.
- Pavonia gentryi Fryxell
- Pavonia glazioviana Gürke
- Pavonia glaziovii (Ulbr.) Fryxell
- Pavonia glechomoides A.St.-Hil.
- Pavonia glutinosa Krapov. & Cristóbal
- Pavonia goetheoides (Hassl.) Fryxell ex G.L.Esteves
- Pavonia gossweileri Exell
- Pavonia gracilis R.E.Fr.
- Pavonia grandiflora A.St.-Hil.
- Pavonia graomogoliana Krapov.
- Pavonia grazielae Krapov.
- Pavonia guerkeana R.E.Fr.

== H ==
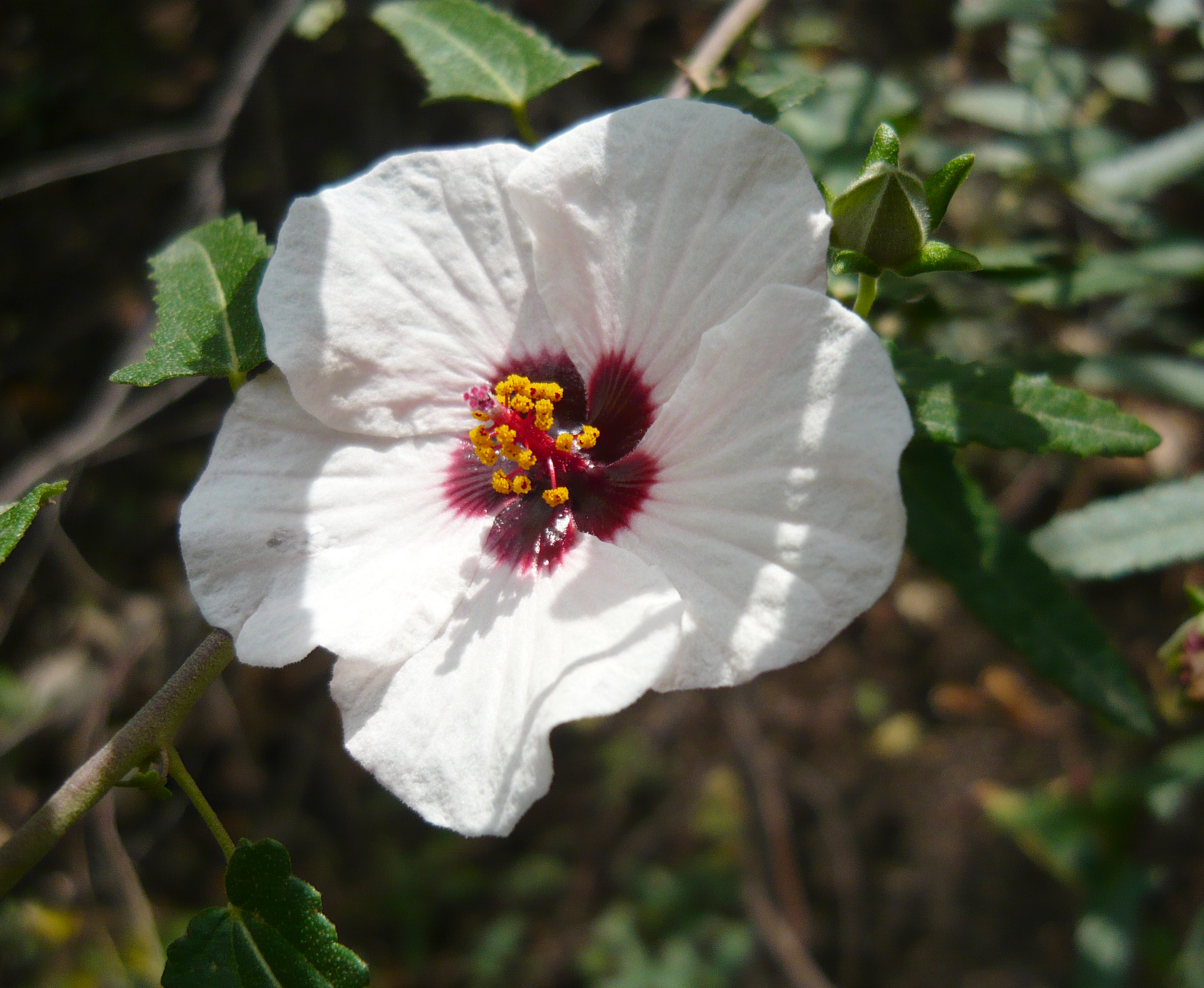
Pavonia hastata

- Pavonia harleyi Krapov.
- Pavonia hassleriana Chodat
- Pavonia hastata Cav. – spearleaf swampmallow
- Pavonia hatschbachii Krapov.
- Pavonia heterostemon Urb.
- Pavonia heterotricha Fryxell
- Pavonia hexaphylla (S.Moore) Krapov.
- Pavonia hieronymi Gürke
- Pavonia hirticalyx Fryxell
- Pavonia hirtiflora Benth.
- Pavonia horrida Krapov.
- Pavonia hotteana Helwig
- Pavonia humifusa A.St.-Hil.

== I ==
- Pavonia imatacensis Steyerm.
- Pavonia immaculata R.E.Fr.
- Pavonia immitis Fryxell
- Pavonia insperabilis Fryxell
- Pavonia integrifolia Standl.
- Pavonia intermedia A.St.-Hil.
- Pavonia intermixta A.Rich.
- Pavonia ionthacarpa Krapov.

== K ==
- Pavonia kearneyi D.M.Bates
- Pavonia kilimandscharica Gürke
- Pavonia kleinii Krapov. & Cristóbal
- Pavonia kotschyi Hochst. ex Webb
- Pavonia krapovickasii Fryxell

== L ==
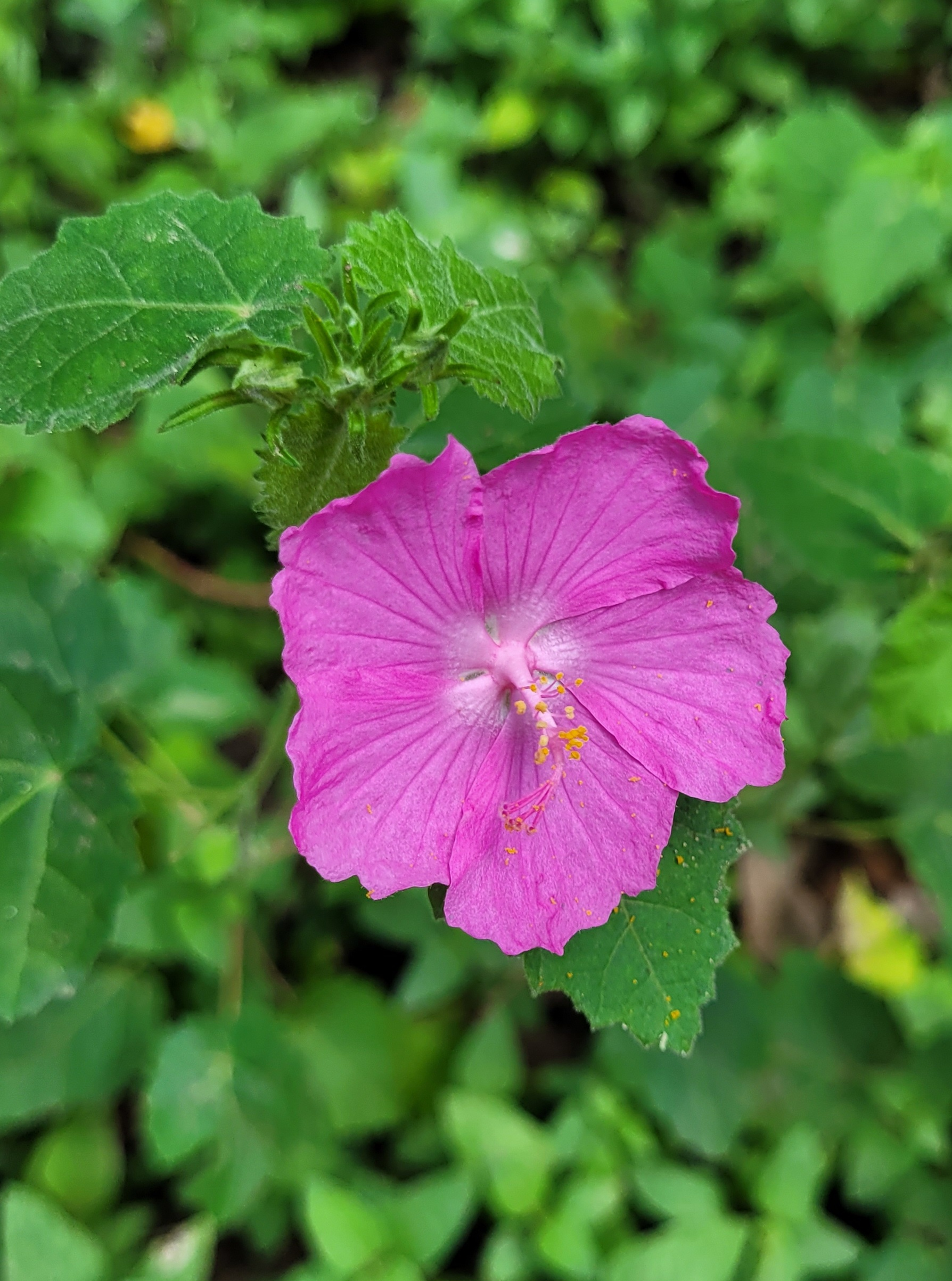
Pavonia lasiopetala

- Pavonia laetevirens R.E.Fr.
- Pavonia lanata R.E.Fr.
- Pavonia lasiopetala Scheele – Texas swampmallow
- Pavonia latibracteolata Krapov.
- Pavonia latifolia (Nees & Mart.) Spreng.
- Pavonia laxifolia A.St.-Hil.
- Pavonia leiocarpa Urb.
- Pavonia leptocalyx (Sond.) Ulbr.
- Pavonia leucantha Garcke
- Pavonia longifolia A.St.-Hil.
- Pavonia longipedunculata Gürke
- Pavonia longipilosa Thulin
- Pavonia longitricha Fryxell
- Pavonia longitudinalis Fryxell
- Pavonia luetzelburgii Ulbr.

== M ==
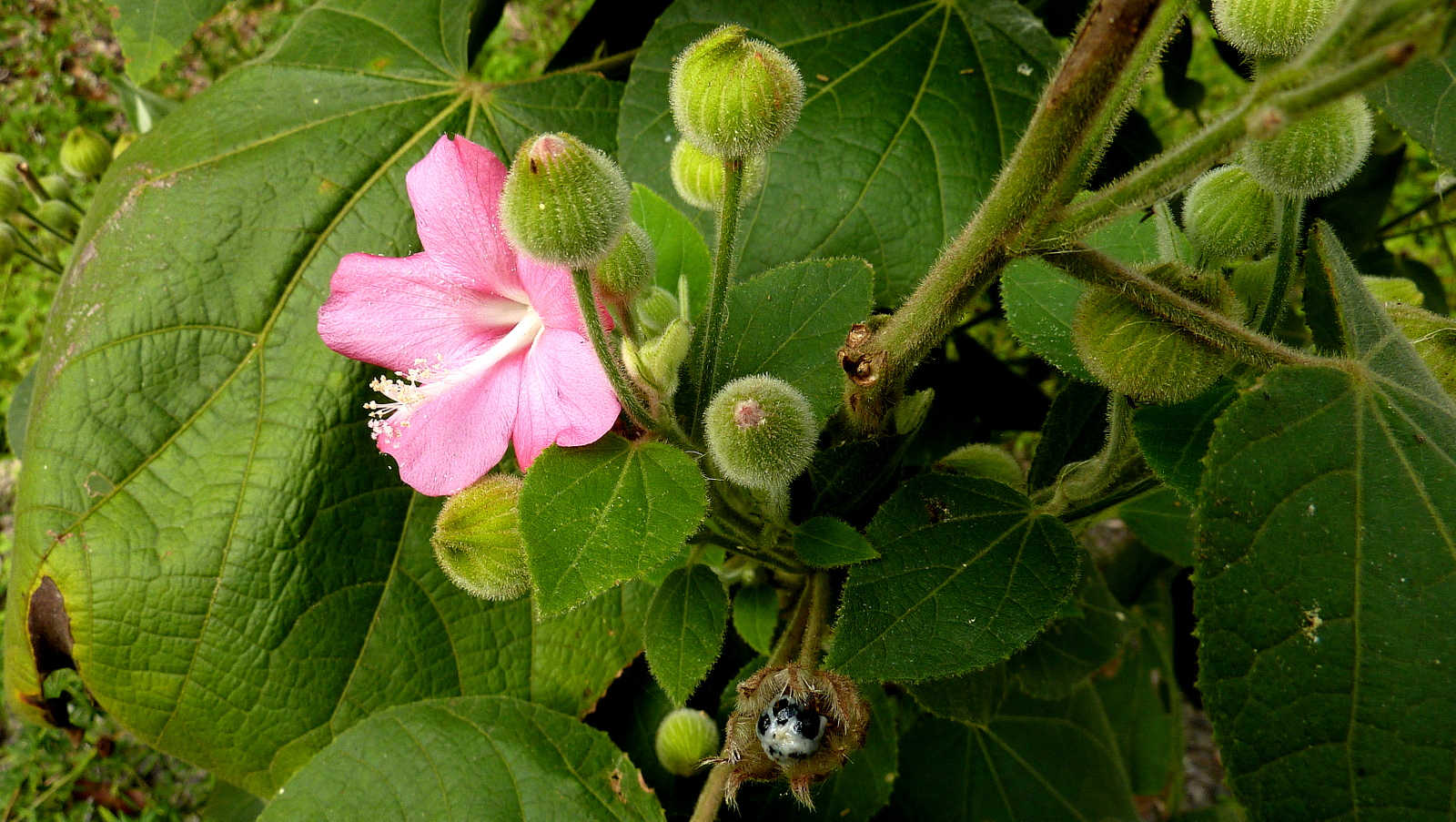
Pavonia malacophylla

- Pavonia macdougallii Fryxell
- Pavonia macrostyla Gürke
- Pavonia makoyana É.Morren
- Pavonia malacophylla (Link & Otto) Garcke
- Pavonia malvaviscoides A.St.-Hil.
- Pavonia marginata Thulin
- Pavonia martii Colla
- Pavonia matteiana Thulin
- Pavonia mattogrossensis R.E.Fr.
- Pavonia meeboldii Ulbr.
- Pavonia melhanioides Thulin
- Pavonia missionum Ekman
- Pavonia mollis Kunth
- Pavonia montana Garcke ex Gürke
- Pavonia monticola Fryxell
- Pavonia morii Krapov.
- Pavonia multiflora A.St.-Hil.
- Pavonia mutisii Kunth

== N ==
- Pavonia nana R.E.Fr.
- Pavonia narcissi Krapov.
- Pavonia nayarensis Fryxell
- Pavonia neei Fryxell
- Pavonia nemoralis A.St.-Hil. & Naudin
- Pavonia nepetifolia (Standl.) Standl.
- Pavonia nigrescens Thulin

== O ==
- Pavonia occhionii Krapov.
- Pavonia opulifolia S.Moore
- Pavonia orientalis Krapov.
- Pavonia ovaliphylla G.L.Esteves & Krapov.
- Pavonia oxyphylla (Moc. & Sessé ex DC.) Fryxell
- Pavonia oxyphyllaria Donn.Sm.

== P ==
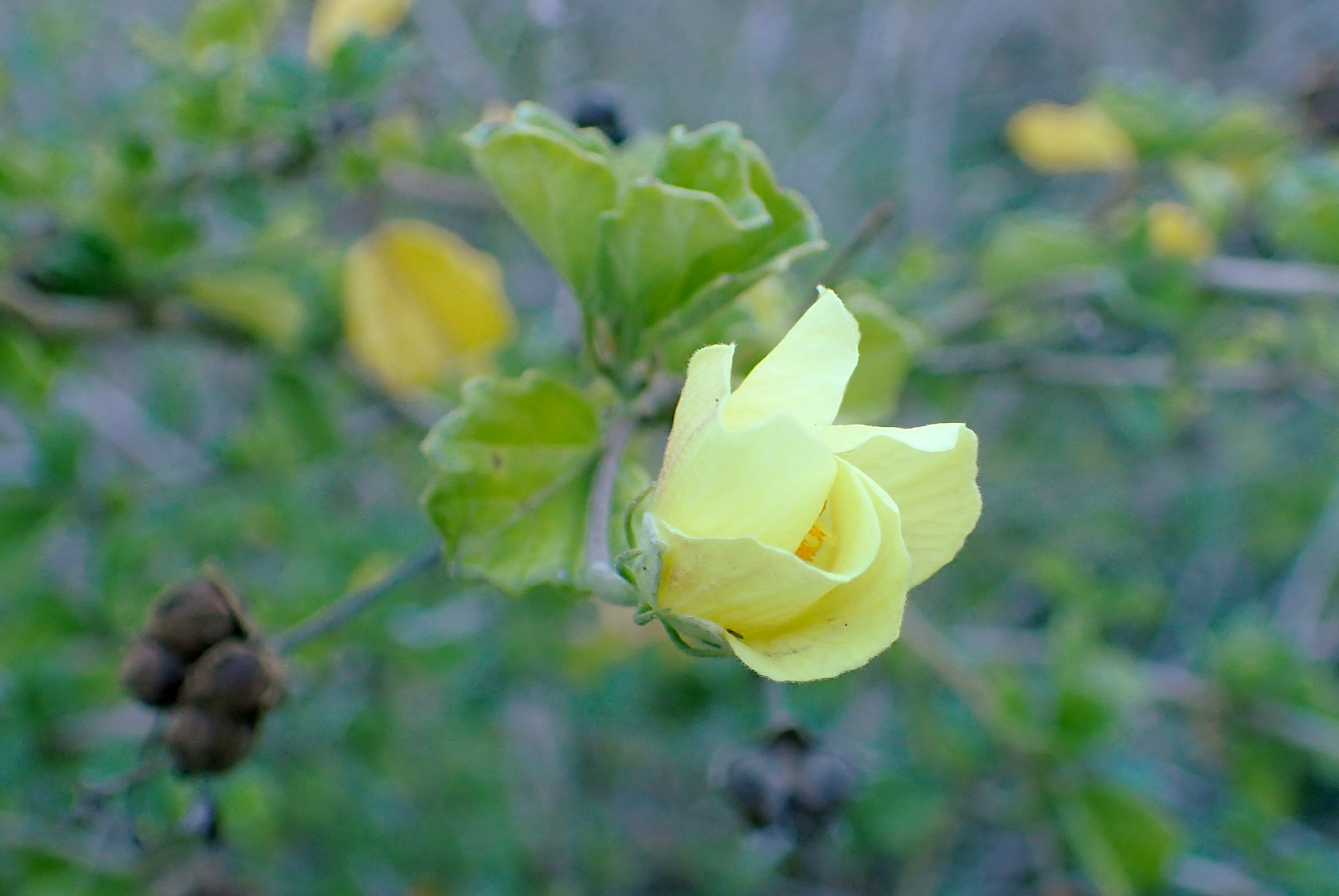
Pavonia praemorsa

- Pavonia pabstii Krapov. & Cristóbal
- Pavonia palmeirensis Krapov.
- Pavonia paludicola Nicolson ex Fryxell
- Pavonia paneroi Fryxell
- Pavonia paniculata Cav.
- Pavonia papilionacea Cav.
- Pavonia paraensis Fryxell
- Pavonia patuliloba Hochr.
- Pavonia paucibracteata Thulin
- Pavonia paucidentata Fryxell
- Pavonia penduliflora (Standl.) Standl.
- Pavonia peruviana Gürke
- Pavonia piauhyensis Ulbr.
- Pavonia pilifera Krapov.
- Pavonia piptocalyx Krapov.
- Pavonia pirottae (A.Terracc.) Chiov.
- Pavonia platyloba R.E.Fr.
- Pavonia pleuranthera (DC.) Fryxell
- Pavonia pohlii Gürke
- Pavonia praemorsa (L.f.) Cav.
- Pavonia prionophylla R.E.Fr.
- Pavonia procumbens (Wight & Arn.) Walp.
- Pavonia propinqua Garcke
- Pavonia pseudolaxifolia Fryxell
- Pavonia pseudotyphalaea Planch. & Linden
- Pavonia psilophylla Ekman
- Pavonia pterocarpa R.E.Fr.
- Pavonia pulchra Hochr.
- Pavonia pulidoae Fryxell
- Pavonia punctata Urb.
- Pavonia purpusii Brandegee

== Q ==
- Pavonia quadrifida Fryxell

== R ==
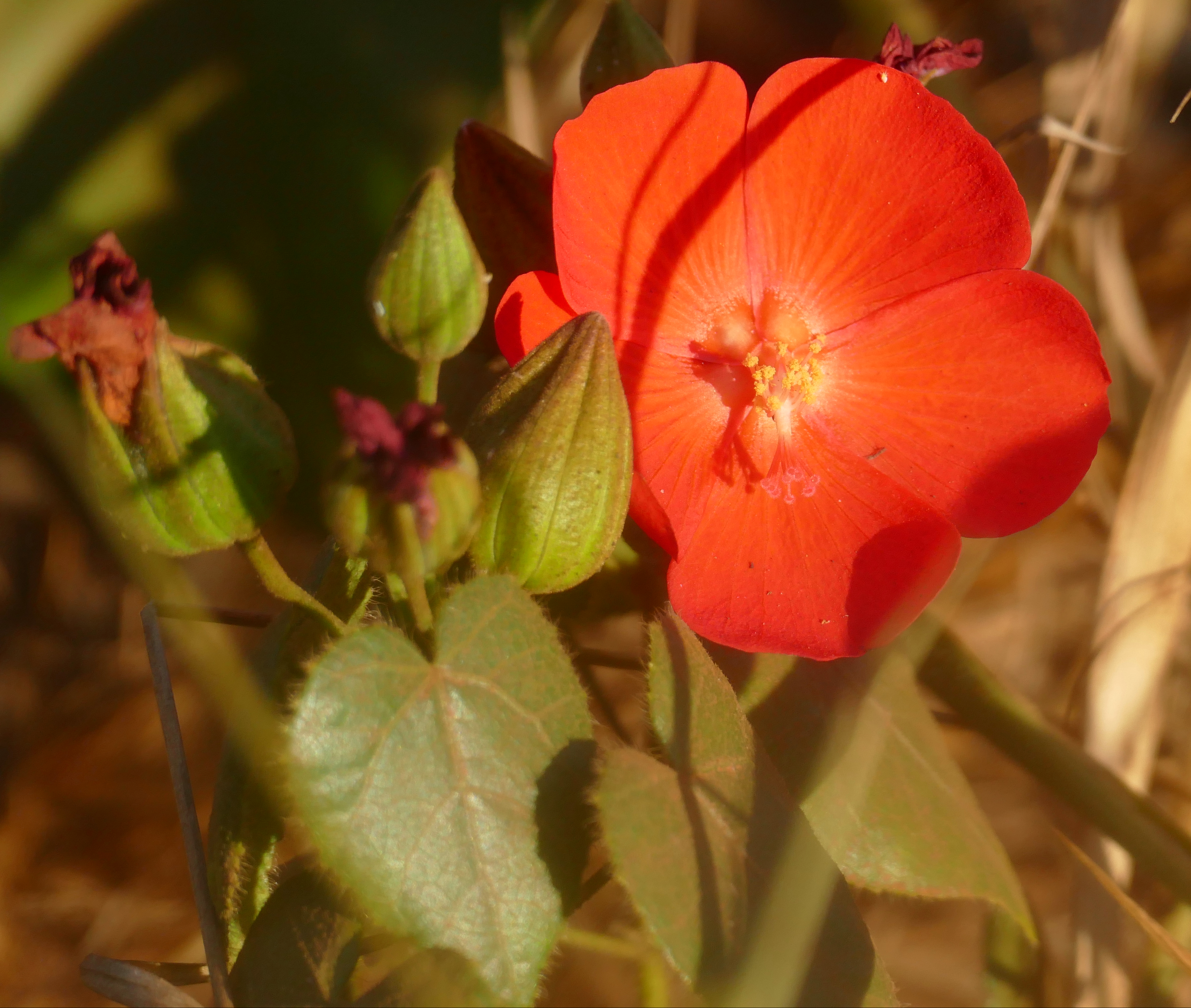
Pavonia rosa-campestris

- Pavonia ramboi Krapov. & Cristóbal
- Pavonia rehmannii Szyszyl.
- Pavonia reitzii Krapov. & Cristóbal
- Pavonia renifolia Krapov.
- Pavonia repens Fryxell
- Pavonia restiaria Bertoni
- Pavonia reticulata Garcke
- Pavonia revoluta Krapov. & Cristóbal
- Pavonia rhizophorae Killip
- Pavonia rhodantha Hochr.
- Pavonia rogersii N.E.Br.
- Pavonia rojasii Hassl.
- Pavonia rosa-campestris A.St.-Hil.
- Pavonia rosengurttii Krapov. & Cristóbal
- Pavonia rotundifolia Thulin & Vollesen
- Pavonia rubra Krapov. & Cristóbal
- Pavonia rudis Fryxell
- Pavonia rupestris (Hassl.) Krapov. & Cristóbal

== S ==
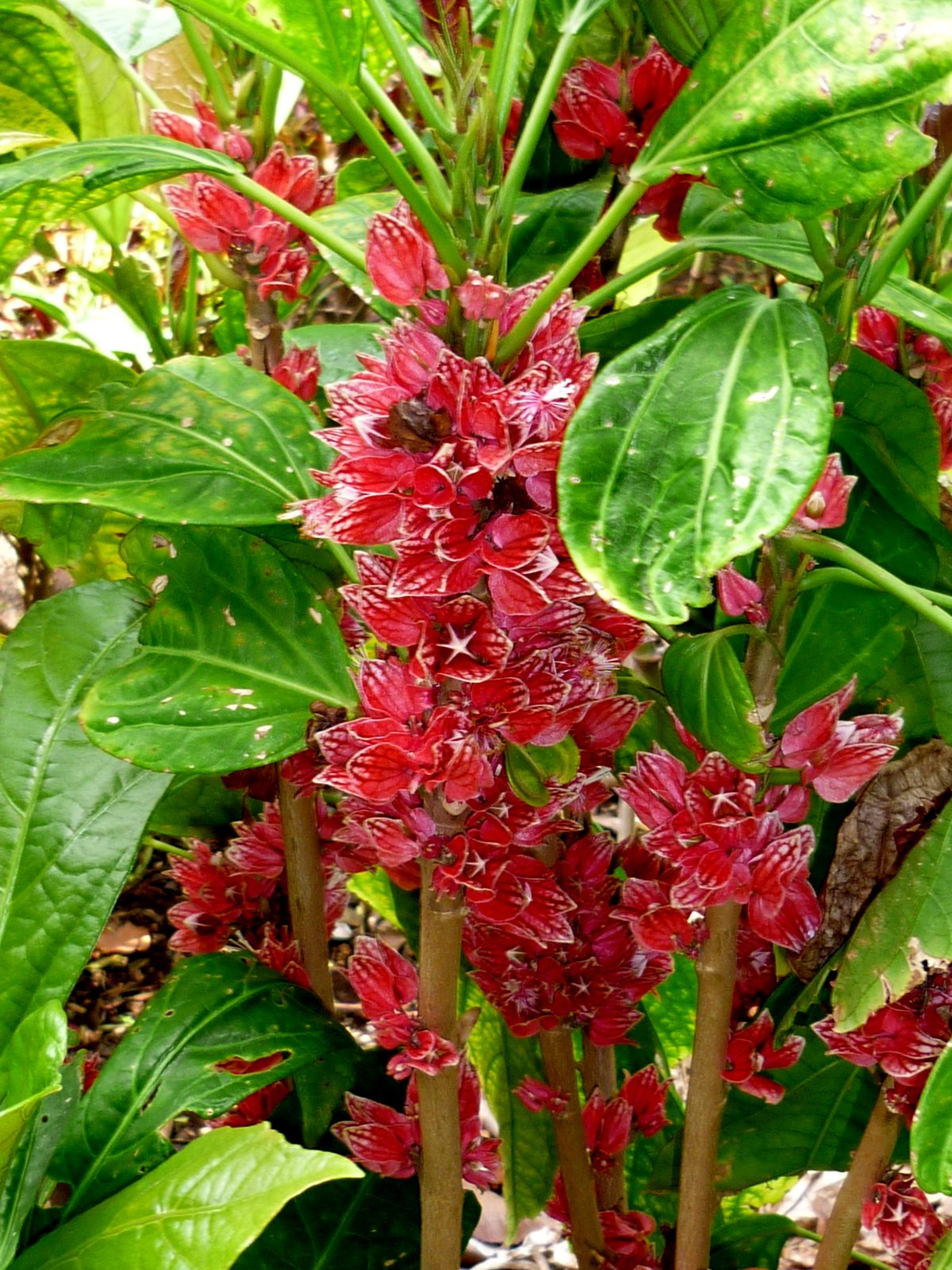
Pavonia strictiflora

- Pavonia sagittata A.St.-Hil.
- Pavonia salmonea Grings & Boldrini
- Pavonia sancti Krapov.
- Pavonia sapucayensis Hassl.
- Pavonia schiedeana Steud.
- Pavonia schimperiana Hochst. ex A.Rich.
- Pavonia schininii Krapov. & Cristóbal
- Pavonia schrankii Spreng.
- Pavonia schwackei Gürke
- Pavonia schweinfurthii Ulbr.
- Pavonia secreta Grings & Krapov.
- Pavonia semiserrata (Schrad.) Steud.
- Pavonia senegalensis (Cav.) Leistner
- Pavonia sepioides Fryxell & Krapov.
- Pavonia sepium A.St.-Hil.
- Pavonia serrana G.L.Esteves
- Pavonia serrata Franch.
- Pavonia setifer (C.Presl) Fryxell
- Pavonia sidifolia Kunth
- Pavonia somalensis Franch.
- Pavonia spectabilis Krapov.
- Pavonia spiciformis Krapov.
- Pavonia spinifex (L.) Cav.
- Pavonia spinistipula Gürke
- Pavonia spuria Fryxell
- Pavonia stenopetala Krapov.
- Pavonia steudneri Ulbr.
- Pavonia stipularis Krapov.
- Pavonia stolzii Ulbr.
- Pavonia striata Krapov.
- Pavonia strictiflora (Hook.) G.L.Esteves
- Pavonia subhastata Triana & Planch.
- Pavonia submutica Fryxell
- Pavonia subrotunda A.St.-Hil. & Naudin

== T ==
- Pavonia tiliifolia (Ulbr.) Fryxell
- Pavonia transvaalensis (Ulbr.) A.Meeuse
- Pavonia tricalycaris A.St.-Hil.
- Pavonia triloba Guill. & Perr.
- Pavonia troyana (Urb.) Urb.

== U ==
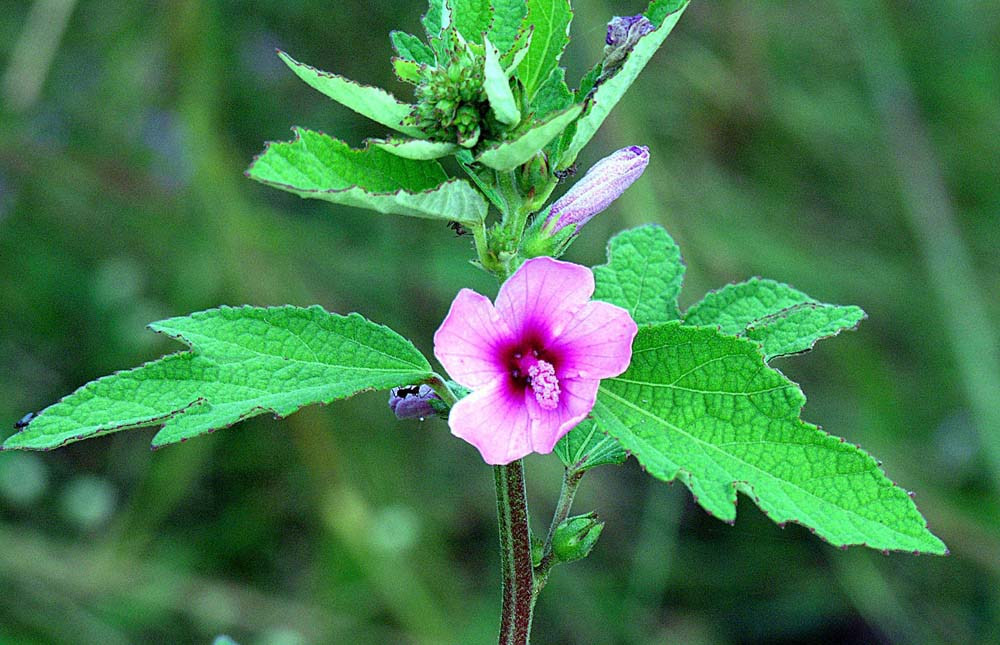
Pavonia urens

- Pavonia undulata Krapov.
- Pavonia uniflora (Sessé & Moc.) Fryxell
- Pavonia urens Cav.

== V ==
- Pavonia vannii Fryxell
- Pavonia varians Moric.
- Pavonia velvetiana Krapov.
- Pavonia venusta Fryxell
- Pavonia vinosa G.L.Esteves
- Pavonia viscidula A.St.-Hil. & Naudin
- Pavonia viscosa A.St.-Hil.
- Pavonia vitifolia Hochr.

== W ==
- Pavonia windischii Krapov.

== X ==
- Pavonia xanthogloea Ekman

== Y ==
- Pavonia yatarendana Krapov. & Cristóbal

== Z ==
- Pavonia zehntneri Ulbr.
- Pavonia zeylonica (L.) Cav.
