= P. hastata =

P. hastata may refer to:

- Pavonia hastata, Cav., a plant species in the genus Pavonia
- Phacelia hastata, the silverleaf scorpion-weed, a plant species
- Populus hastata, a synonym for Populus trichocarpa, a tree species
- Prosthechea hastata (Lindl.) W.E.Higgins (1997 publ. 1998), an orchid species in the genus Prosthechea

== See also ==
- Hastata (disambiguation)
