= Rock rose =

Rock rose, rock-rose, and rockrose are common names of various plants, including:

- Cistaceae
- Cistus
- Halimium
- Helianthemum
- Oenothera cespitosa
- Pavonia lasiopetala
- Phemeranthus
- Portulaca grandiflora
