= Cancellaria (disambiguation) =

Cancellaria may refer to:

- Cancellaria, a genus of sea snails in the family Cancellariidae
- Cancellaria, a synonym of the plant genus Pavonia in the family Malvaceae
