= Pavonia × gledhillii =

- Pavonia × gledhillii cultivated in the University of Wrocław Botanical Garden

Scientific classification
- Kingdom: Plantae
- Clade: Tracheophytes
- Clade: Angiosperms
- Clade: Eudicots
- Clade: Rosids
- Order: Malvales
- Family: Malvaceae
- Genus: Pavonia
- Species: P. × gledhillii

Binomial name
- Pavonia × gledhillii Cheek

Species of flowering plant

Pavonia × gledhillii is a species of shrub in the family Malvaceae. It is a hybrid of Pavonia multiflora and Pavonia makoyana.

== Description ==
Pavonia × gledhillii flower

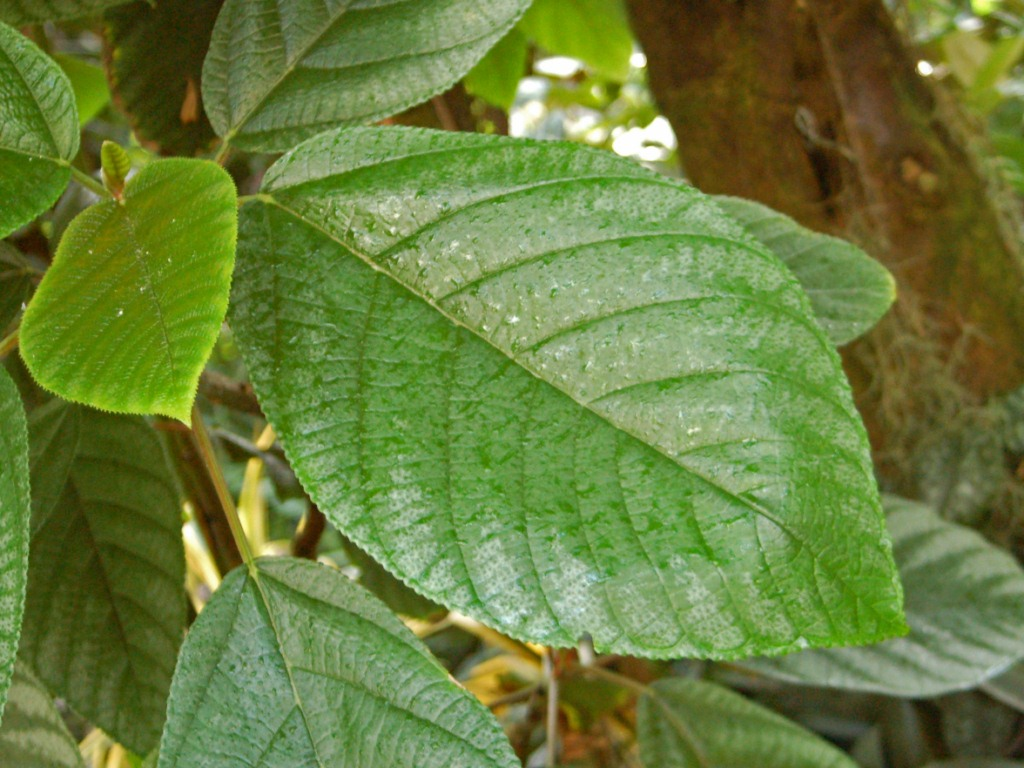
Pavonia × gledhillii foliage

=== Vegetative characteristics ===
Pavonia × gledhillii is an up to 2 m tall, sparsely branching, evergreen shrub with pale brown, woody, finely ridged branches. The terete, leaf-bearing stems are matt green. The persistent, rigid, erect, linear-lanceolate stipules are 14–16 mm long, and 1.5–2.5 mm wide. The 25–48 mm long petiole is 1 mm wide. The narrowly elliptic-lanceolate, acuminate lamina with a sporadically serrate margin is 10.5–15.8 cm long, and 2.5–3.7 cm wide. The leaf venation is pinnate.

=== Generative characteristics ===
The solitary, axillary flowers are produced towards apex of the branches. The shortly tomentose peduncles are 18–38 mm long, and 0–8 mm wide. The tomentose pedicels are 5 mm long. The 9–10, linear-lanceolate, incurved epicalyx bracts are 28 mm long, and 3–4.5 mm wide. The adaxial surface of the bracts is glabrous, and the abaxial surface is scabrid with stellate pubescence. The cylindrical, 22–23 mm long calyx is densely stellate-tomentose. The corolla is composed of 5 tightly imbricate petals, which form a tube. The stamens have bright red filaments and purplish blue anthers and pollen. The 9–10 red styles have capitate stigmas. The hard, subglobose, pubescent, 10 mm long, and 8 mm wide fruits are enclosed in the persistent calyx and epicalyx.

== Taxonomy ==
It was described by Martin Roy Cheek in 1989. The type specimen was collected by D. Gledhill from a plant cultivated at the University of Bristol Botanical Garden.

=== Etymology ===
The generic name honours Spanish botanist José Antonio Pavón Jiménez (1754–1844). The epithet gledhillii come from Dr. David Gledhill, curator in 1989 of University of Bristol Botanic Garden.

== Uses ==
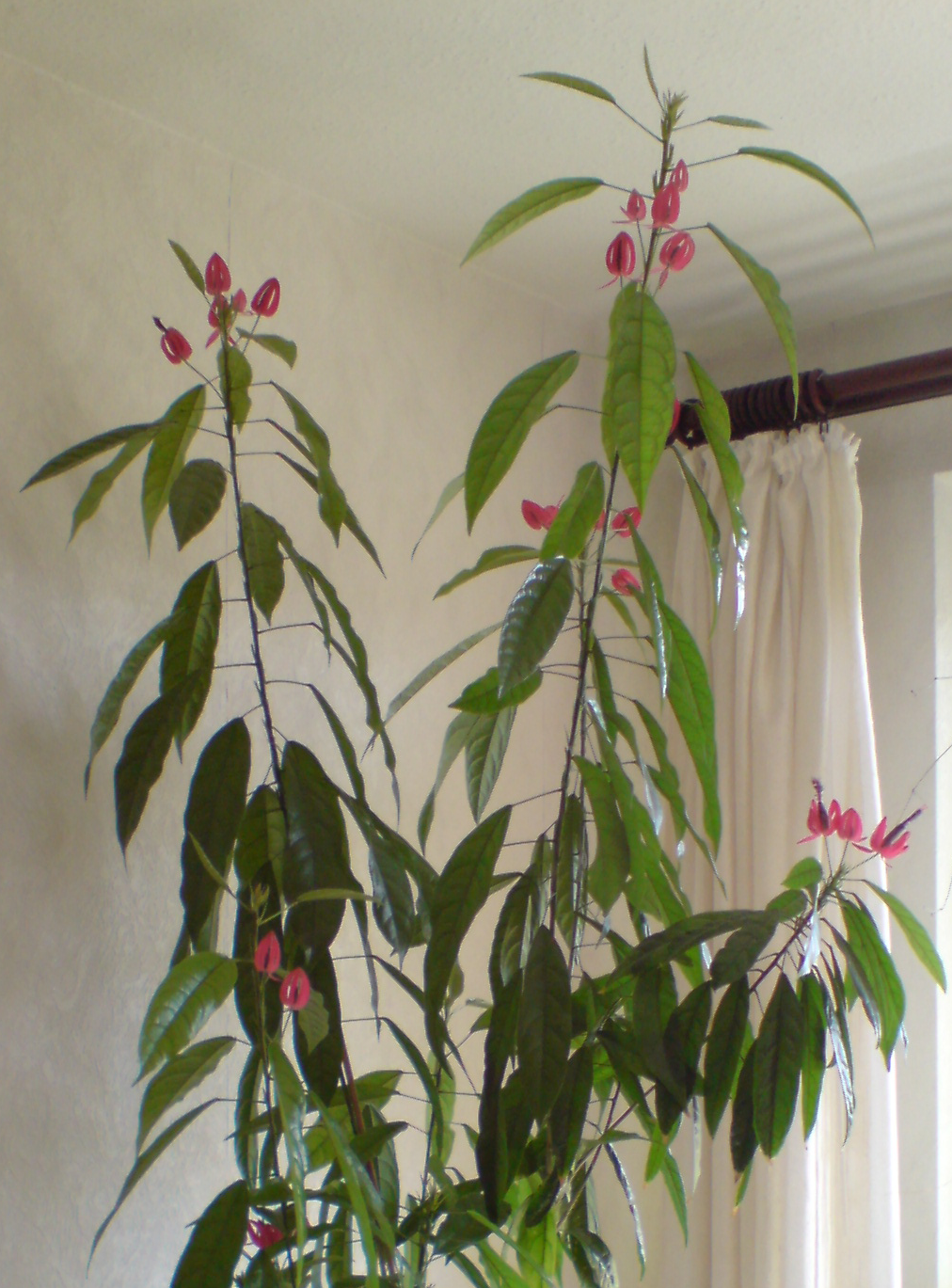
Pavonia × gledhillii grown as an indoor plant

It is cultivated as an ornamental plant.
