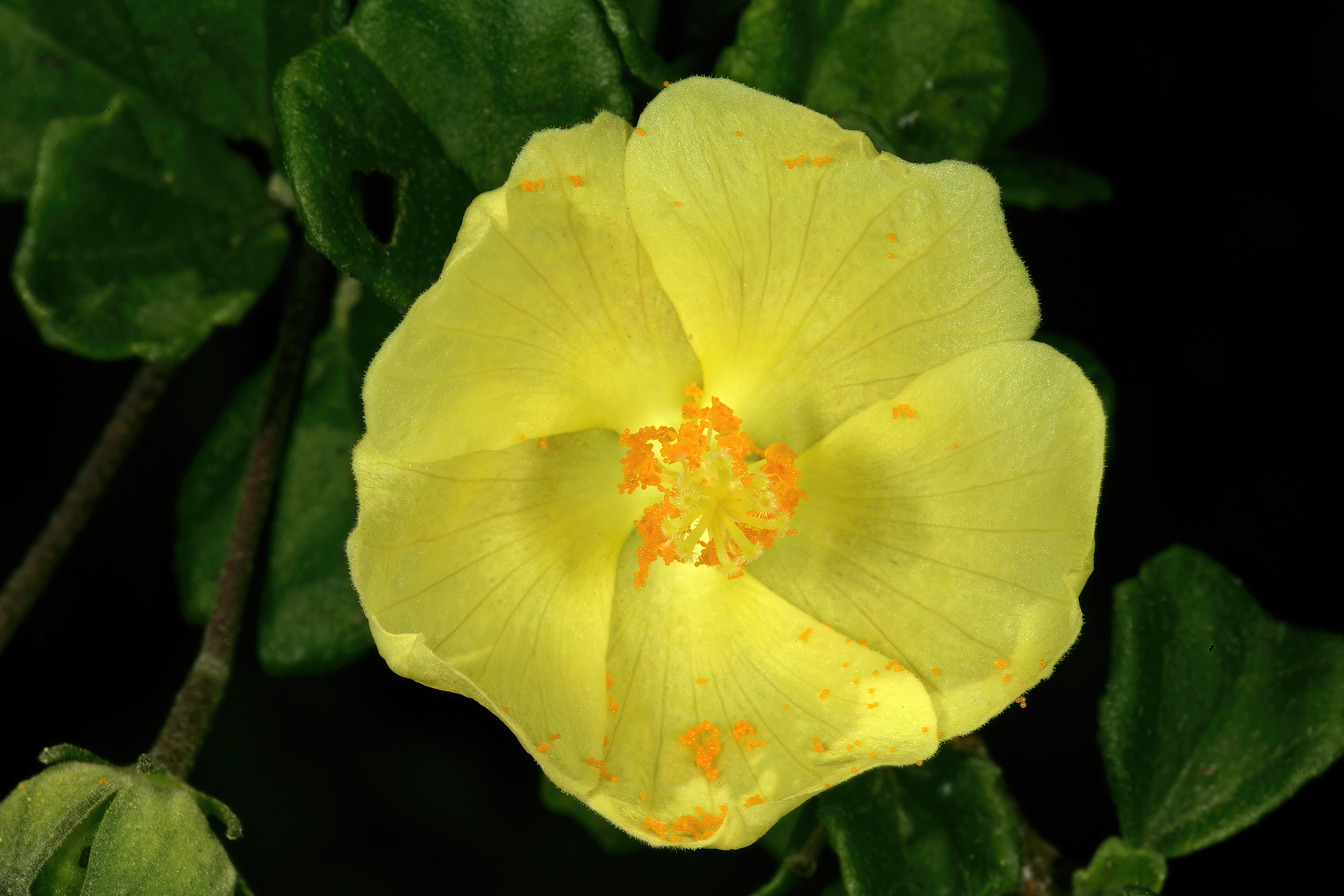

Conservation status
- Least Concern (SANBI Red List)

Scientific classification
- Kingdom: Plantae
- Clade: Tracheophytes
- Clade: Angiosperms
- Clade: Eudicots
- Clade: Rosids
- Order: Malvales
- Family: Malvaceae
- Genus: Pavonia
- Species: P. praemorsa

Binomial name
- Pavonia praemorsa (L.f.) Cav. (1787)

Synonyms
- Hibiscus praemorsus L.f. (1782) (basionym); Lass praemors Kuntze; Malache praemorsa Kuntze; Urena praemorsa Salisb.; Abelmoschus decandrus Medik.; Hibiscus cuneifolius (Cav.) Dum.Cours.; Hibiscus decandrus Medik. ex Steud.; Pavonia cuneifolia Cav.

= Pavonia praemorsa =

Species of plant

Pavonia praemorsa, commonly referred to as yellow mallow, and sometimes as yellow pavonia, shell flower, butter bits and yellow butter bits is a species of flowering shrub in the mallow family. It is native to the southern coast of South Africa, and produces bright yellow flowers, which bloom and die over the course of a single day. It is drought-resistant and can survive low temperatures, despite mainly growing in the subtropics. Its flowers are also attractive to multiple pollinators.

== Description ==
Pavonia praemorsa is a species of flowering shrub in the mallow family; it is commonly referred to as yellow mallow, and sometimes as yellow pavonia, shell flower, and butter bits. Its epithet, praemorsa, originates from a Latin word meaning "appearing to have been bitten off", in reference to the shape of its leaves' tips. It is categorized as a least-concern species according to the Red List of South African Plants.

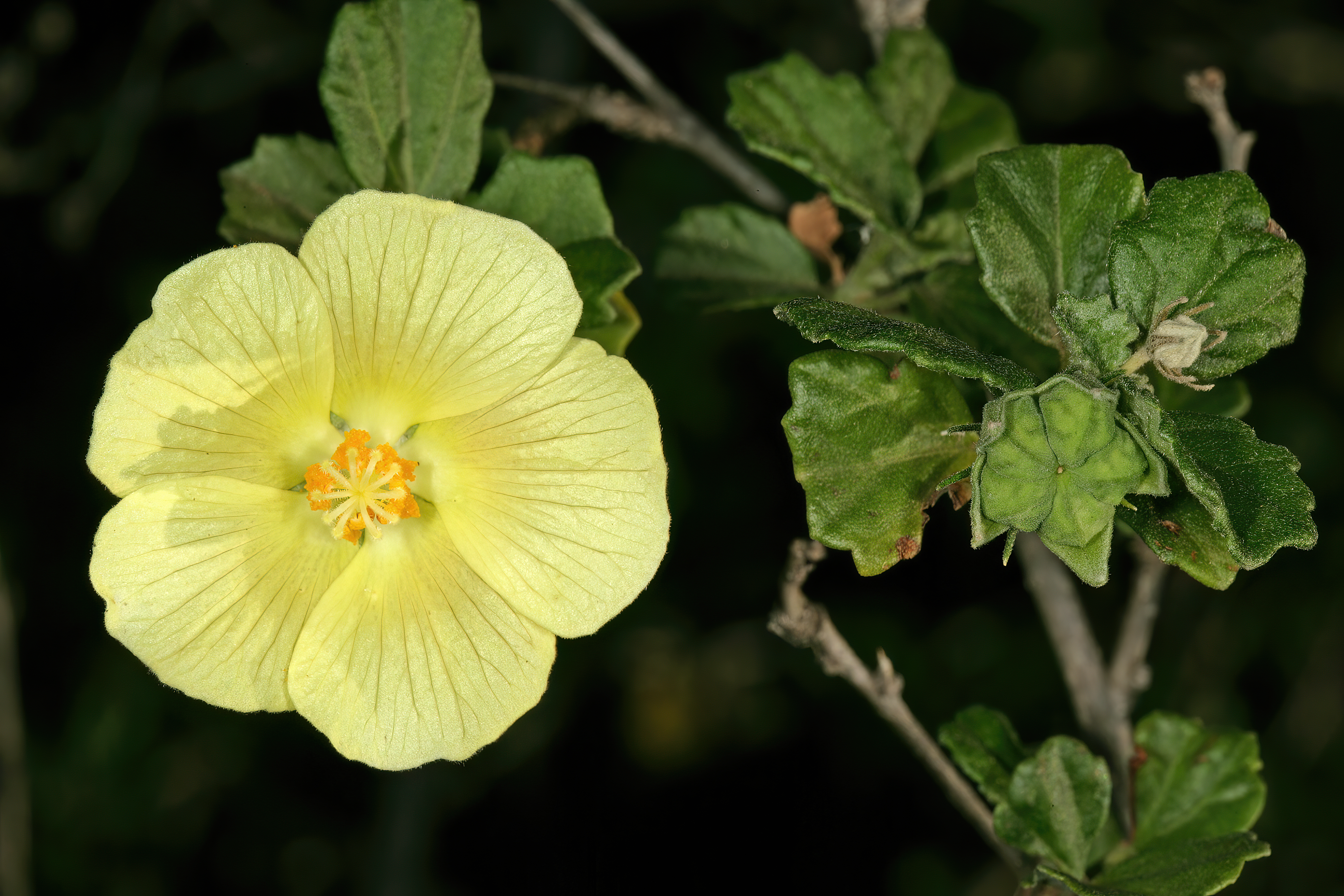
P. praemorsa's flower and leaves

The species is a perennial evergreen; it can grow to be about two meters tall and two meters wide. Its flower has bright yellow petals with reddish veins and a yellow stamen. They resemble hibiscuses, despite belonging to a separate genus. Over the course of a single day, they bloom, shut and die, and fall to the ground; generally, the flowers begin to fall by late afternoon. It flowers year-round, with its peak blooming seasons being spring and autumn. The plant has a tough, thin stem, leathery leaves, and a capsular fruit. Its flower is attractive to bees, butterflies, and hummingbirds.

Pavonia praemorsa is native to South Africa. It is generally found in the Cape Province, especially in the Eastern Cape, near the country's southern shore on the Indian Ocean. It mainly grows in the subtropics, although it is able to withstand temperatures as low as −9.4 °C (15.1 °F). The species is also drought-resistant. Besides its natural growth, the plant is cultivated for hedging and for its flower.
