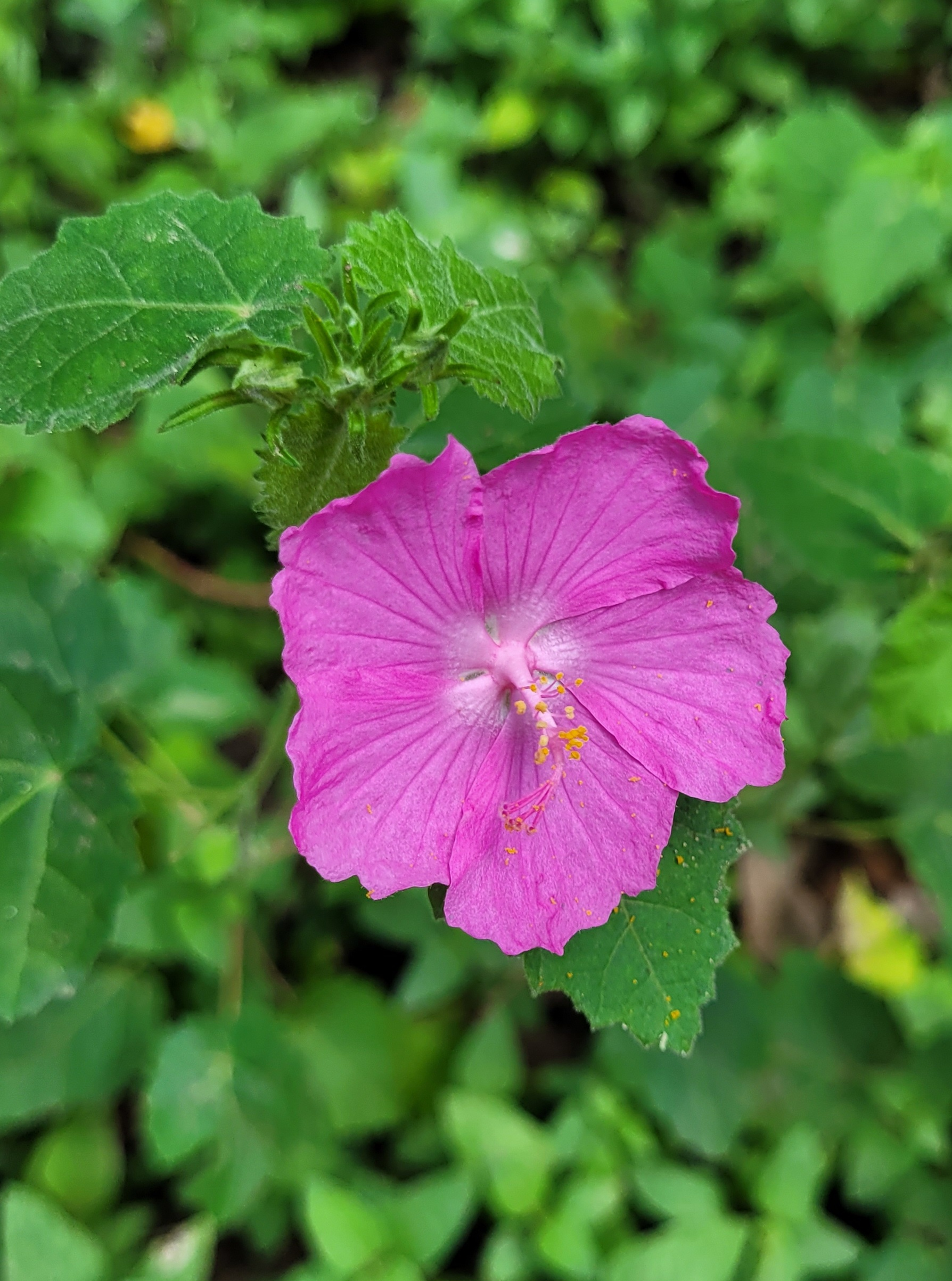

Conservation status
- Apparently Secure (NatureServe)

Scientific classification
- Kingdom: Plantae
- Clade: Tracheophytes
- Clade: Angiosperms
- Clade: Eudicots
- Clade: Rosids
- Order: Malvales
- Family: Malvaceae
- Genus: Pavonia
- Species: P. lasiopetala

Binomial name
- Pavonia lasiopetala Scheele

Synonyms
- Malache lasiopetala (Scheele) Kuntze; Malache wrightii (A. Gray) Kuntze; Pavonia wrightii A. Gray

= Pavonia lasiopetala =

Species of flowering plant

Pavonia lasiopetala is a species of flowering plant in the mallow family known by the common names that include Texas swamp-mallow, Wright pavonia, and rock rose. It is native to Texas in the United States and Coahuila and Nuevo León in Mexico.

This is a shrubby perennial herb growing up to 4 feet tall. The alternately arranged leaves have toothed or lobed edges and are up to 2.5 inches long. The flowers have five red or pink petals and bloom from June until the fall months. They are attractive to hummingbirds.

Many animals feed on the plant, including livestock. It is added to seed mixes used to vegetate rangeland in its native range.

This plant is cultivated for use as a garden and landscaping flower. It has the capacity to become weedy.
