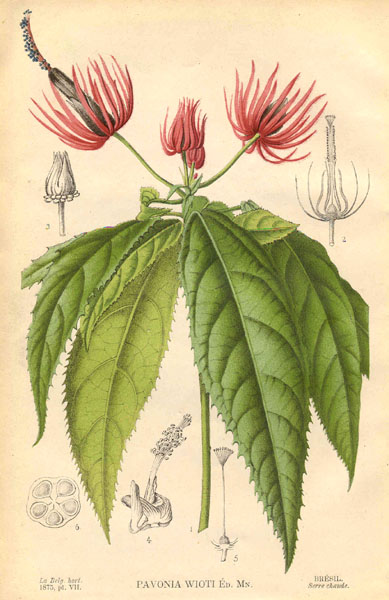
- Botanical illustration of Pavonia multiflora

Scientific classification
- Kingdom: Plantae
- Clade: Tracheophytes
- Clade: Angiosperms
- Clade: Eudicots
- Clade: Rosids
- Order: Malvales
- Family: Malvaceae
- Genus: Pavonia
- Species: P. multiflora

Binomial name
- Pavonia multiflora A.St.-Hil.
- It is endemic to southeastern Brazil

Synonyms
- Goethea multiflora (A.St.-Hil.) N.E.Br.; Malvaviscus multiflorus (A.St.-Hil.) Spach; Triplochlamys multiflora (A.St.-Hil.) Ulbr.; Pavonia lanceolata Colla; Pavonia wiotii É.Morren

= Pavonia multiflora =

Species of flowering plant

Pavonia multiflora, the Brazilian candle plant, is a species of plant in the family Malvaceae endemic to southeastern Brazil. It is cultivated as an ornamental plant.

== Description ==
Botanical illustration of Pavonia multiflora

Pavonia multiflora growing in Farias, Linhares, Espírito Santo, Brasil

=== Vegetative characteristics ===
Pavonia multiflora is a 1.5–2.5 m tall, sparsely branched, evergreen shrub with long, lanceolate, markedly serrate, 10–15cm long leaves.

=== Generative characteristics ===
The solitary, axillary, erect, bright red to reddish-purple flowers are 3 cm long, and up to 6 cm wide. The flower has a conspicuous red epicalyx and calyx. The flower has 18–20 epicalycular, red or dark pink, filamentous bracts in 2 dimorphic whorls, which enclose the flower. The deep purple petals enclose the central column of stamens. The dark blue stamens with indigo blue pollen protrude from the flower. The small, rounded, capsule fruit is hairy. The flowering period extends from May to October, but in the right conditions this plant can bloom all winter long.

== Taxonomy ==
It was described by Auguste François César Prouvençal de Saint-Hilaire in 1827. The type specimen was collected by A. F. C. P. de Saint-Hilaire in Espirito Santo, Brazil. In cultivation, Pavonia multiflora has been confused with the hybrid Pavonia × gledhillii, which has 9–10 equal, broader bracts, and a sub-entire leaf margin.

=== Etymology ===
The genus name Pavonia honours the Spanish botanist José Antonio Pavón and the specific epithet multiflora means many-flowered.

== Distribution and habitat ==
It is endemic to southeastern Brazil, where it occurs in the Mata Atlântica Atlantic rainforest. The extent of occurrence is 14530471 km^{2}, and the area of occupancy is 16400 km^{2}.

== Conservation ==
In the Red List of Brazilian Flora from 2012, it was categorised as least concern.

== Cultivation ==
It is normally grown as a houseplant in temperate zones, where it requires a humid environment and temperatures above 10 °C (50 °F). It has gained the Royal Horticultural Society's Award of Garden Merit. The hybrid Pavonia × gledhillii has been confused with Pavonia multiflora and it is more frequent in cultivation than the true Pavonia multiflora.
