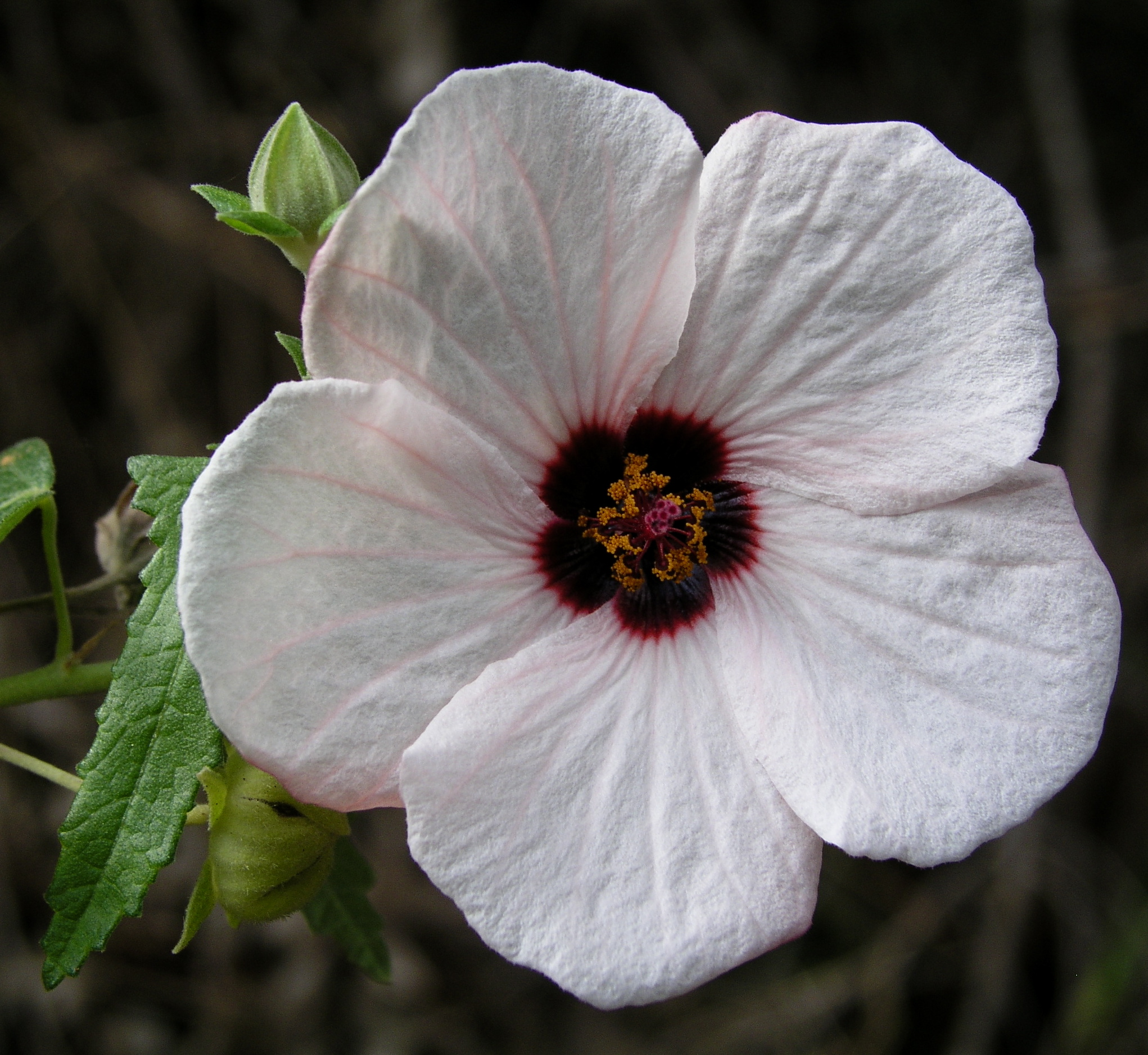

Scientific classification
- Kingdom: Plantae
- Clade: Tracheophytes
- Clade: Angiosperms
- Clade: Eudicots
- Clade: Rosids
- Order: Malvales
- Family: Malvaceae
- Genus: Pavonia
- Species: P. hastata

Binomial name
- Pavonia hastata Cav.

Synonyms
- Lassa hastata (Cav.) Kuntze; Greevesia cleisocalyx F.Muell.

= Pavonia hastata =

Species of shrub

Pavonia hastata, commonly known as spearleaf swampmallow or pink pavonia, is a shrub in the family Malvaceae.

== Distribution ==
The species is native to Brazil, Bolivia, Argentina, Paraguay and Uruguay. It was previously considered to be native to Australia as well, but is no longer thought to be.

== Description ==
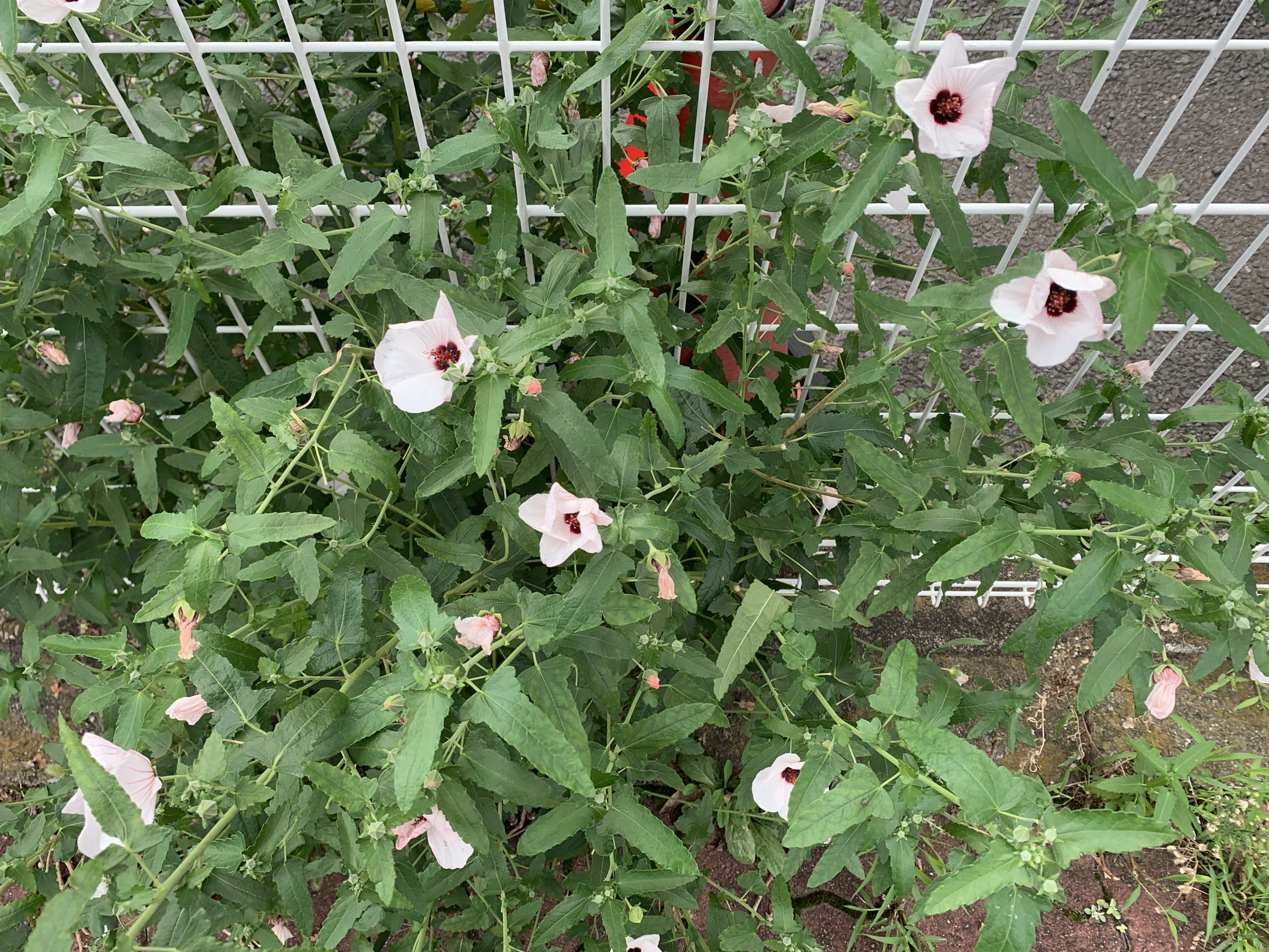
Growing at roadside

A spreading subshrub or shrub, the plant grows to 1.5 metre high and have leaves that are 10 to 60 mm long and 10 to 25 mm wide. Leaves ovate to oblong with heart-shaped or willow-shaped base, toothed, rough-haired on the upper side, hairy on the lower side, 1-6 cm long, 1-2.5 cm wide with 3 cm long petioles.

=== Inflorescence ===
The hibiscus-like flowers are pink with a red throat. Flowers solitary in the leaf axils, on petioles shorter than the leaves. Outer lining almost as long as the lining, hairy. Petals up to 1.2 cm long, white to reddish purple with dark basal spot. Stamens gave 12 pieces. The first flowers in spring are often cleistogamous and much smaller than those that come later in the season. Flowering occurs profusely during summer and autumn.

== Cultivation ==
The species is easily propagated by seed or cuttings.
