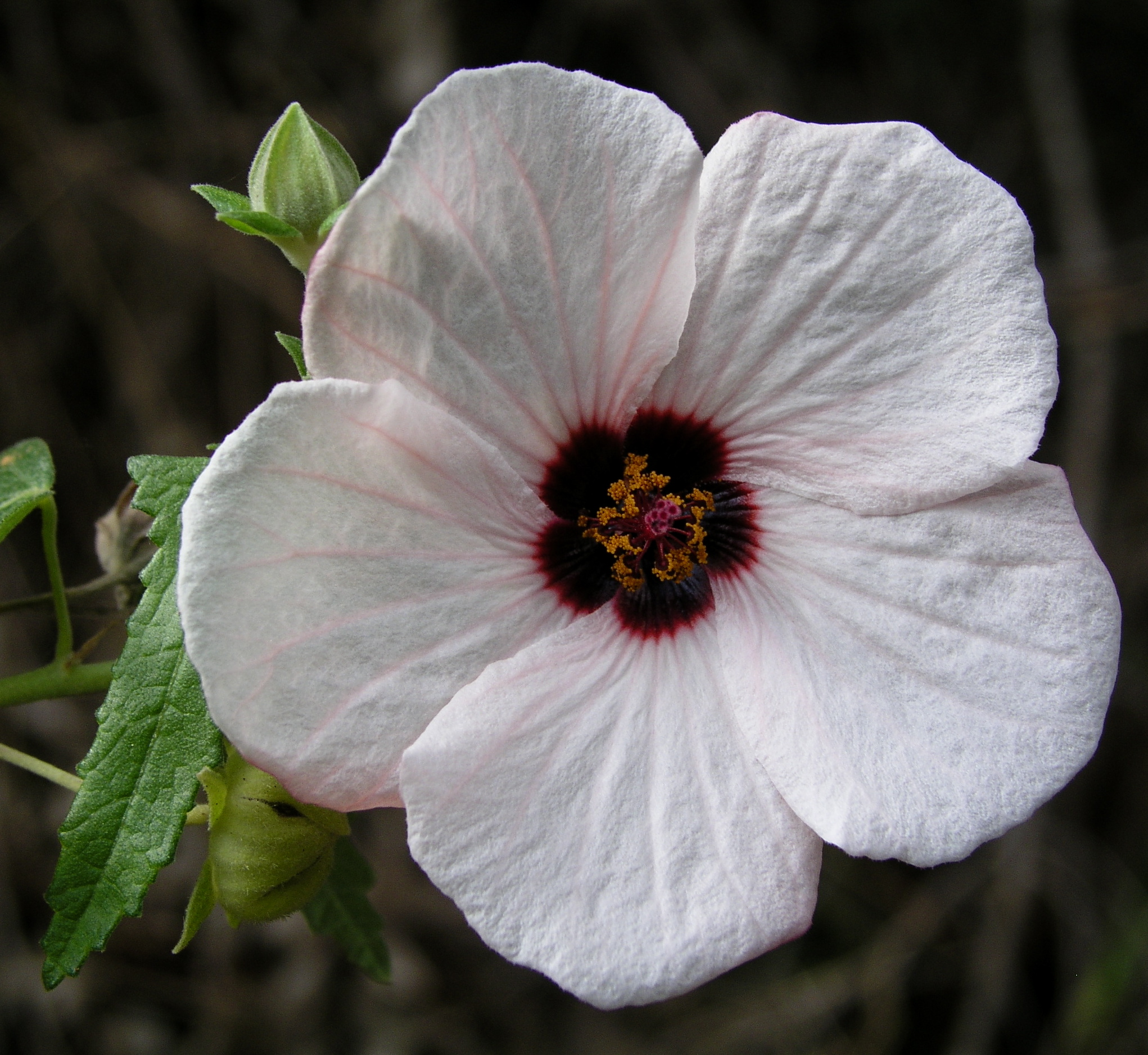
- Pavonia hastata

Scientific classification
- Kingdom: Plantae
- Clade: Tracheophytes
- Clade: Angiosperms
- Clade: Eudicots
- Clade: Rosids
- Order: Malvales
- Family: Malvaceae
- Subfamily: Malvoideae
- Tribe: Hibisceae
- Genus: Pavonia; Cav.

Species
- See text

Diversity
- c. 300 species

Synonyms
- Asterochlaena Garcke; Blanchetiastrum Hassl.; Cancellaria (DC.) Mattei; Codonochlamys Ulbr.; Goethea Nees; Lass Adans.; Lopimia Mart.; Malache Vogel; Pseudopavonia Hassl.; Pteropavonia Mattei; Thorntonia Rchb.; Triplochlamys Ulbr.

= Pavonia (plant) =

Genus of flowering plants

Pavonia is a genus of flowering plants in the mallow family, Malvaceae. The generic name honours Spanish botanist José Antonio Pavón Jiménez (1754–1844), as chosen by his contemporary, Spanish botanist Antonio José Cavanilles. Several species are known as swampmallows.

== Hybrids ==
Pavonia × gledhillii Cheek, 1989 (Pavonia makoyana × Pavonia multiflora)

== Gallery ==
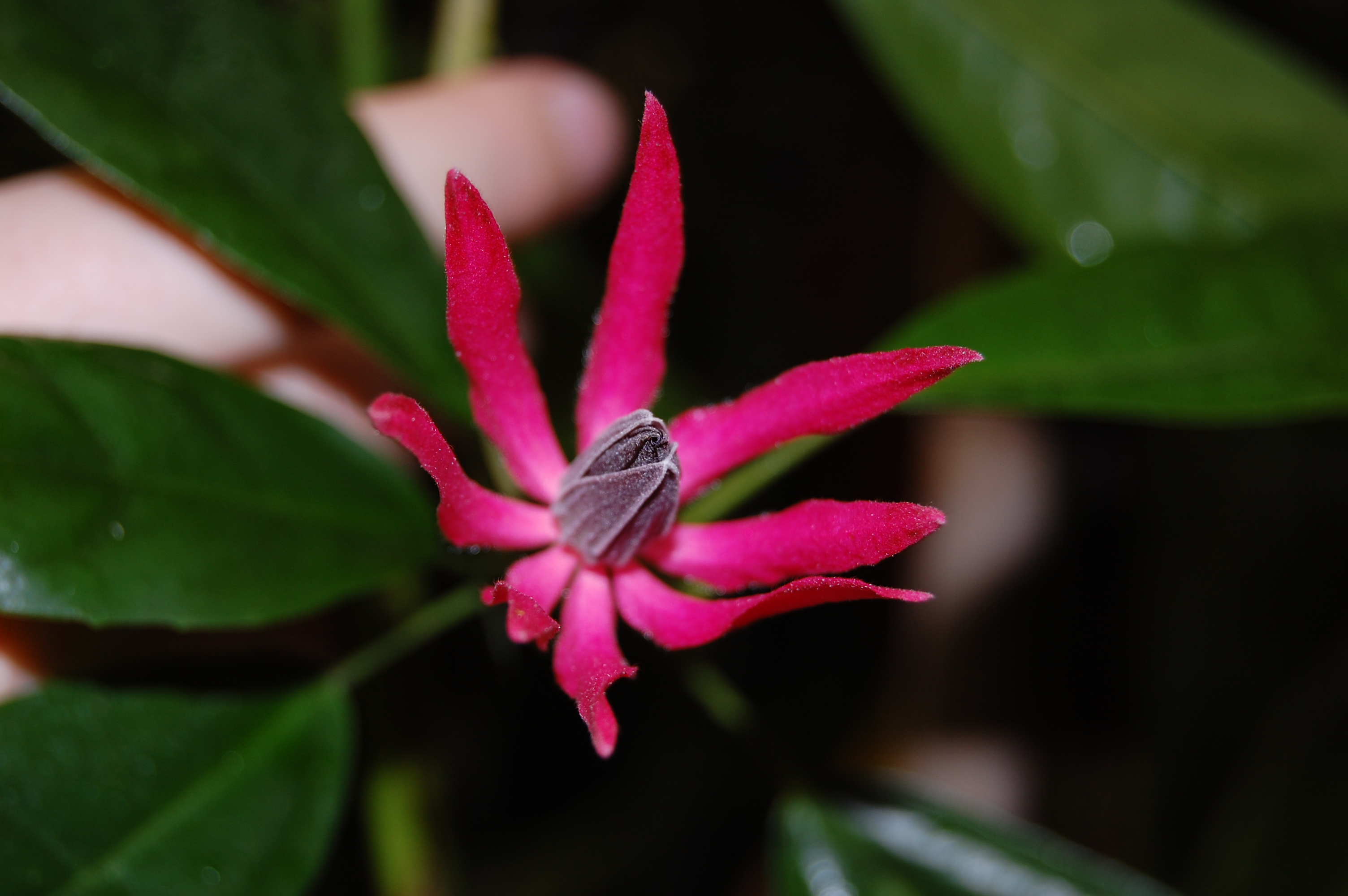
Pavonia intermedia

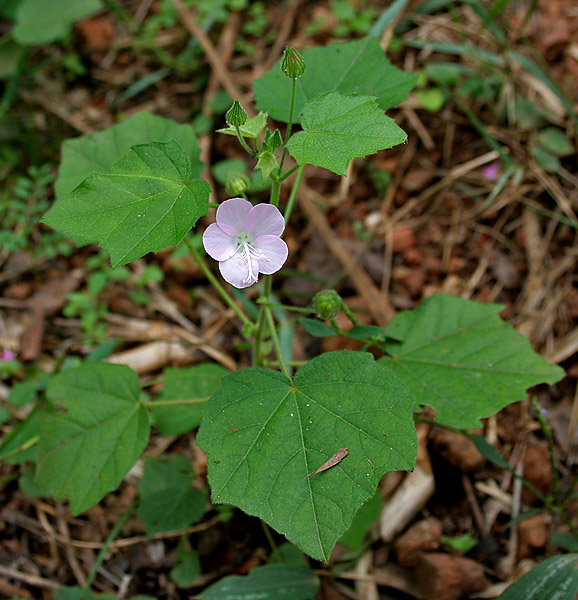
Pavonia odorata

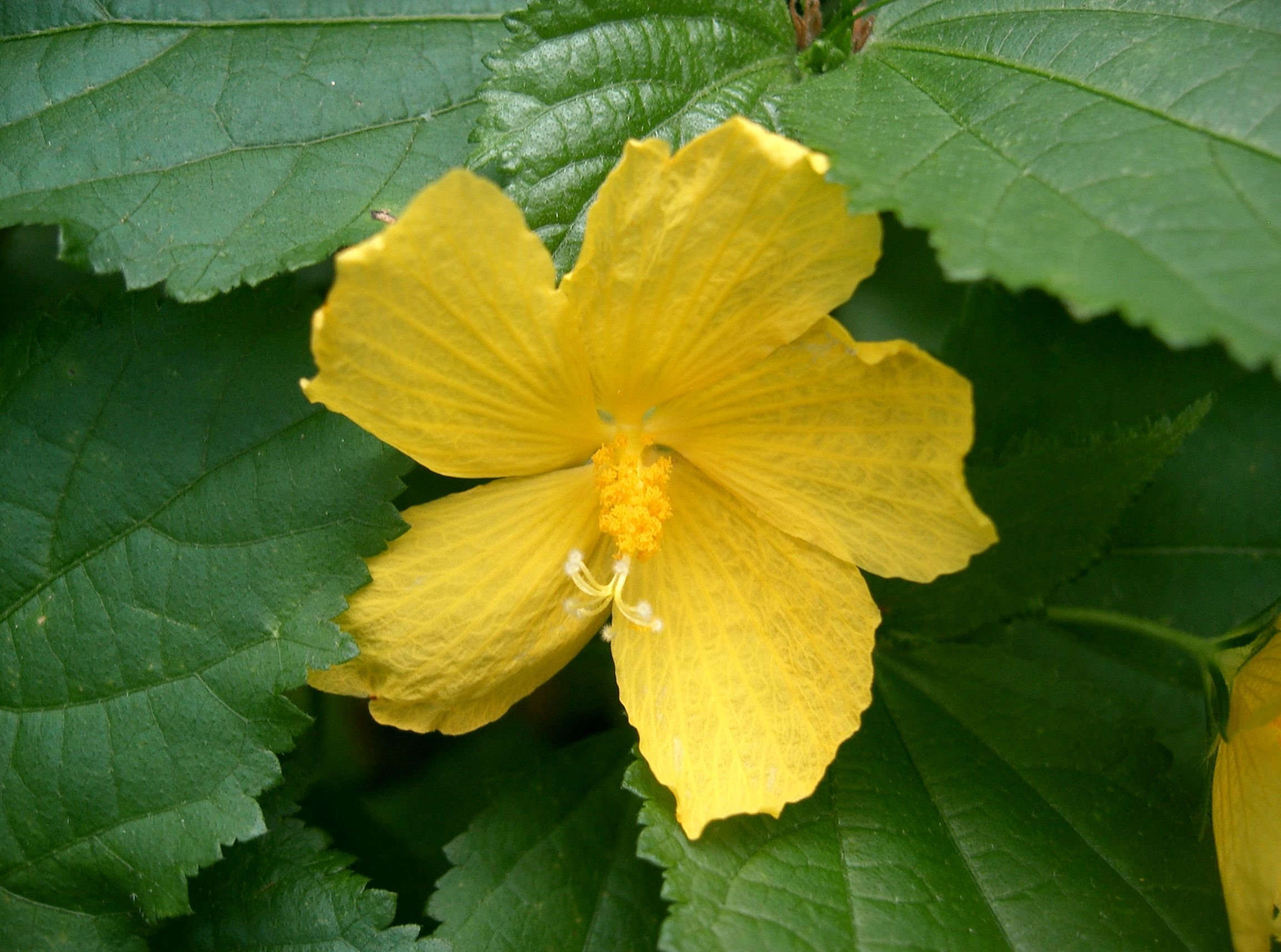
Pavonia spinifex

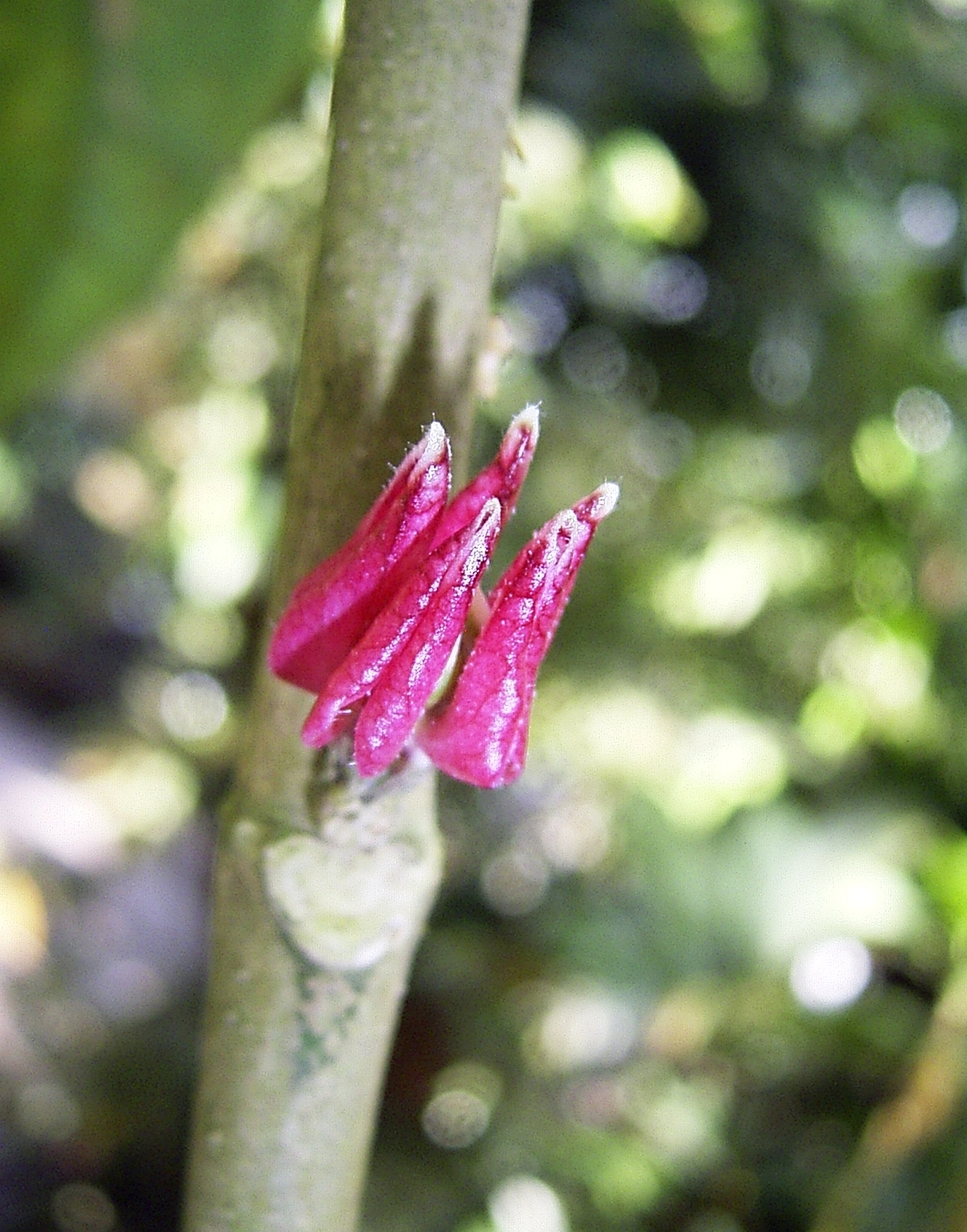
Pavonia strictiflora

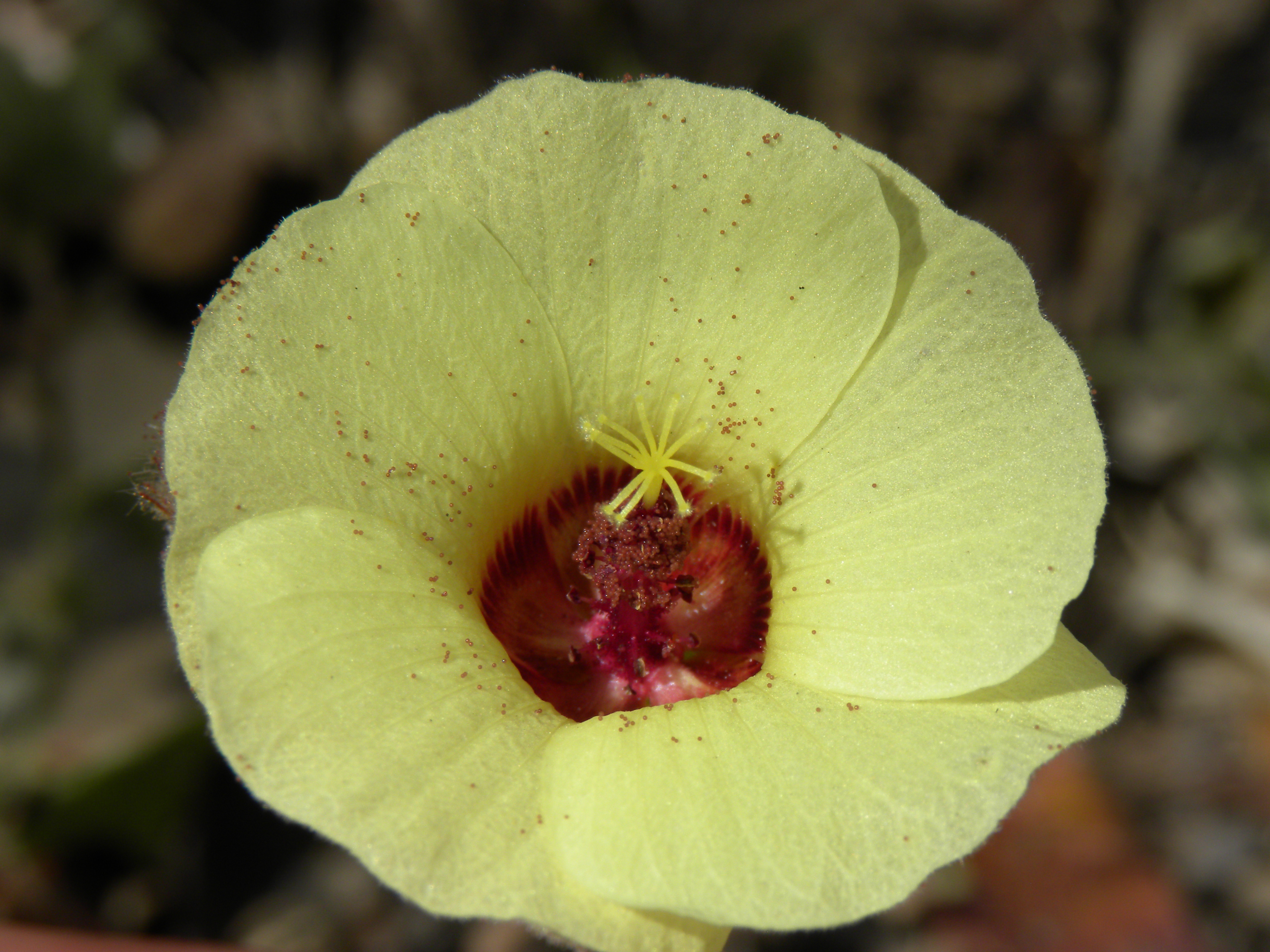
Pavonia cancellata
